= Amanitin =

Amanitin may refer to several related amatoxins:

- α-Amanitin
- β-Amanitin
- γ-Amanitin
- ε-Amanitin

== See also ==
- Amatoxin, a class of toxic compounds that include the amanitins
- Amanin, another amatoxin
