= C39H53N9O14S =

The molecular formula C_{39}H_{53}N_{9}O_{14}S (molar mass: 903.96 g/mol, exact mass: 903.3432 u) may refer to:

- Amanin
- epsilon-Amanitin
