= Oligo =

Oligo may refer to:

- Oligomer, as an abbreviation for the general term, or specifically for oligonucleotide, oligopeptide, oligosaccharide, or oligoester.
- OLIGO Primer Analysis Software
- Oligo- as a prefix, meaning "few"
