= C39H54N10O13S =

The molecular formula C_{39}H_{54}N_{10}O_{13}S (molar mass: 902.97 g/mol, exact mass: 902.3593 u) may refer to:

- Amaninamide
- Gamma-Amanitin
