= Oligopeptidase B =

Class of enzymes

Identifiers
- EC no.: 3.4.21.83
- CAS no.: 57657-67-7

Databases
- IntEnz: IntEnz view
- BRENDA: BRENDA entry
- ExPASy: NiceZyme view
- KEGG: KEGG entry
- MetaCyc: metabolic pathway
- PRIAM: profile
- PDB structures: RCSB PDB PDBe PDBsum
Search
- PMC: articles
- PubMed: articles
- NCBI: proteins

Oligopeptidase B (EC 3.4.21.83, protease II, Escherichia coli alkaline proteinase II) is an enzyme. This enzyme catalyses the following chemical reaction

Hydrolysis of -Arg-, -Lys- bonds in oligopeptides, even when P1' residue is proline

This enzyme is present in Escherichia coli.
