= Streptomyces michiganensis =

Scientific classification
- Domain: Bacteria
- Kingdom: Bacillati
- Phylum: Actinomycetota
- Class: Actinomycetes
- Order: Streptomycetales
- Family: Streptomycetaceae
- Genus: Streptomyces
- Species: S. michiganensis

Binomial name
- Streptomyces michiganensis Corbaz et al. 1957

Type strain
- ATCC 14970, ATCC 19786, BCRC 11613, CBS 416.59, CBS 538.68, CCRC 11613, CGMCC 4.1736, DSM 40015, DSN 40015, ETH 14411, ETH 9001, ICMP 131, IFO 12797, ISP 5015, JCM 4594, KCC S-0594, LMG 20042, NBRC 12797, NRRL B-1940, NRRL-ISP 5015, RIA 1065, UNIQEM 172, VKM Ac-862

Species of bacterium

Streptomyces michiganensis is a bacterium species from the genus of Streptomyces which has been isolated from soil in the United States. Streptomyces michiganensis produces actinomycin X, antipain and mitomycin.

== See also ==
- List of Streptomyces species
