= Cyclamide =

Chemical structure of aerucyclamide A, a prototypical cyclamide

Cyclamides are a class of oligopeptides produced by cyanobacteria algae strains such as Microcystis aeruginosa. Some of them can be toxic.

Cyclamides are cyclopeptides with either six or eight amino acids, some of which are modified from their natural proteinogenic form. They are typically characterized by thiazole and oxazole rings which are thought to be cysteine and threonine derivatives, respectively. Cyclamides are biosynthesized through ribosomic pathways.

== See also ==
- Cyanopeptolin
- Microcystin
