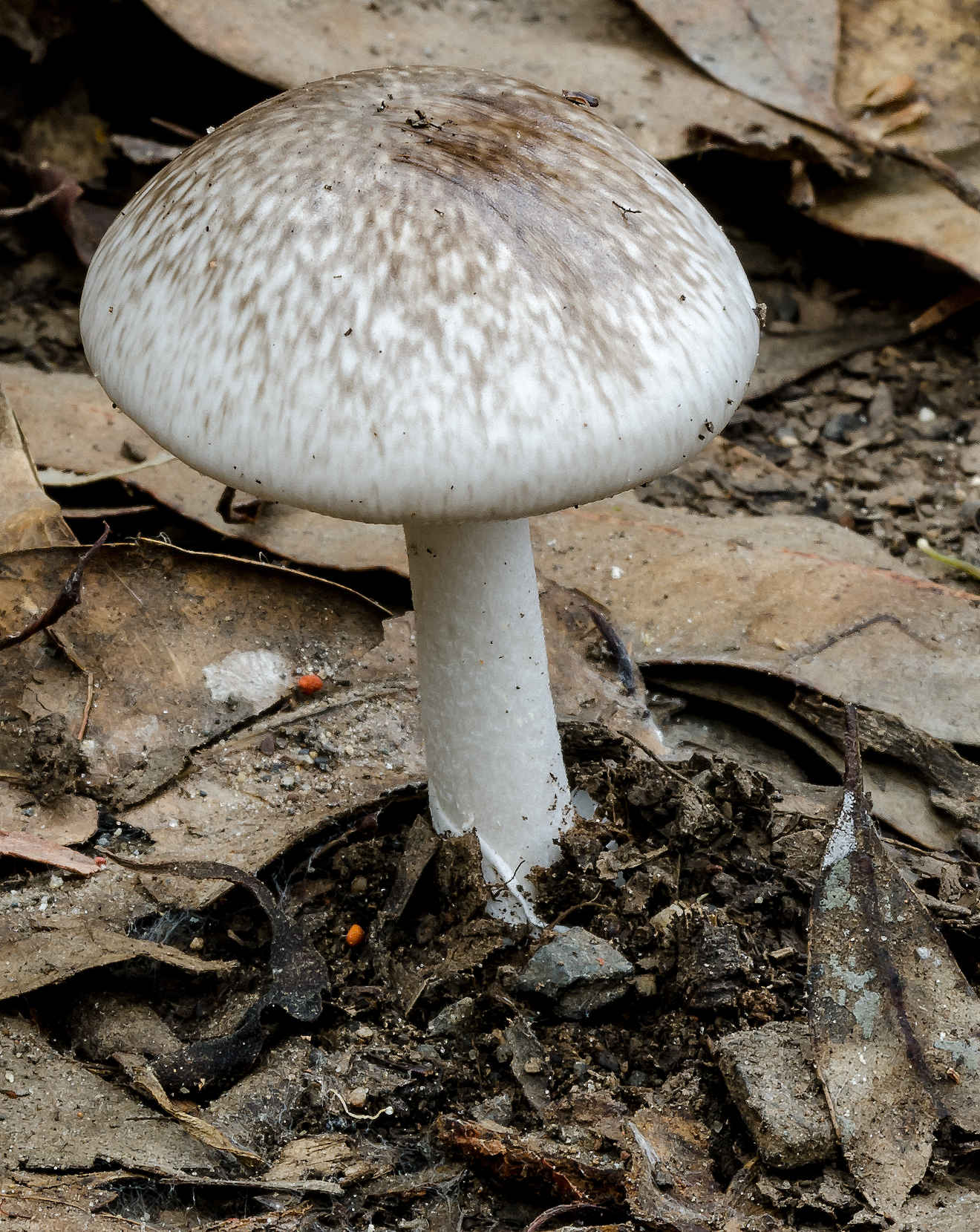

Scientific classification
- Kingdom: Fungi
- Division: Basidiomycota
- Class: Agaricomycetes
- Order: Agaricales
- Family: Amanitaceae
- Genus: Amanita
- Species: A. marmorata

Binomial name
- Amanita marmorata (Cleland & E.-J. Gilbert) E.-J. Gilbert 1941

= Amanita marmorata =

Species of fungus

Amanita marmorata is a species of Amanita found in Denmark and South Australia. It is commonly known as the marbled death cap. Its name derives from the marbling pattern on its pileus, and its relation to A. phalloides.

== Appearance ==
A. marmorata may be mistaken for edible Agaricus spp., and is 45–60 mm wide on its pileus. The fruiting body may appear white, gray, or brown. Their appearance is similar to many common mushrooms. A skirt-like annulus is found on its stipe, and the base of the stipe is bulbous and encased in a saccate volva.

=== Toxicity ===
The cap, gills, stipe, and spores are all poisonous. The species contains amatoxins which are deadly to humans.

A. marmorata may have a strong odor that can develop from mild to pungent over time.

=== Spores ===
A. marmorata spores are spheroid to ellipsoid. They have a white to cream spore print.
