= Oligopeptidase A =

Identifiers
- EC no.: 3.4.24.70
- CAS no.: 394250-11-4

Databases
- IntEnz: IntEnz view
- BRENDA: BRENDA entry
- ExPASy: NiceZyme view
- KEGG: KEGG entry
- MetaCyc: metabolic pathway
- PRIAM: profile
- PDB structures: RCSB PDB PDBe PDBsum
Search
- PMC: articles
- PubMed: articles
- NCBI: proteins

Oligopeptidase A (EC 3.4.24.70, 68000-M signalpeptide hydrolase) is an enzyme. This enzyme catalyses the following chemical reaction

Hydrolysis of oligopeptides, with broad specificity. Gly or Ala commonly occur as P1 or P1' residues, but more distant residues are also important, as is shown by the fact that Z-Gly-Pro-Gly-Gly-Pro-Ala is cleaved, but not Z-(Gly)5

This enzyme is known from Escherichia coli and Salmonella typhimurium.
