= Anti-pain =

Anti-pain may refer to:

- A colloquial term for analgesia
- Antipain, a peptide used in biochemical research
