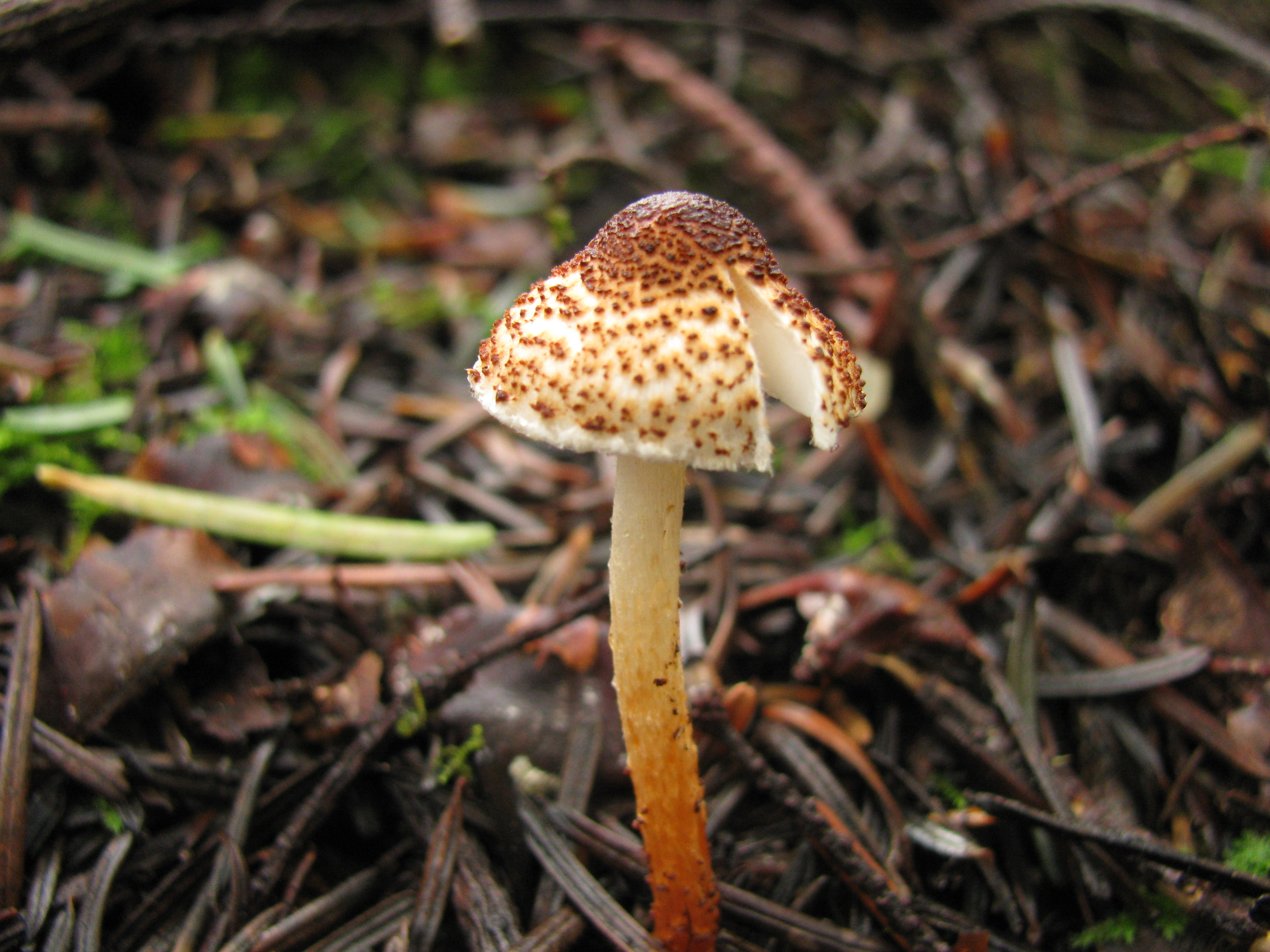

Scientific classification
- Domain: Eukaryota
- Kingdom: Fungi
- Division: Basidiomycota
- Class: Agaricomycetes
- Order: Agaricales
- Family: Agaricaceae
- Genus: Lepiota
- Species: L. castanea

Binomial name
- Lepiota castanea Quél.

= Lepiota castanea =

Species of fungus

Lepiota castanea Mycological characteristics
- Gills on hymenium
- Cap is campanulate or conical
- Hymenium is adnexed
- Stipe has a ring
- Spore print is white
- Ecology is saprotrophic
- Edibility is deadly

Lepiota castanea, commonly known as the chestnut dapperling or petite parasol, is an uncommon, gilled mushroom of the genus Lepiota in the order Agaricales. It was described by French mycologist Lucien Quélet in 1881.

It is known to contain amatoxins and is potentially deadly poisonous.

== Description ==
The cap is broadly bell-shaped to flat, white with dark red-brown scales; it is up to 3 cm in diameter. The gills are whitish and the stem is typically chestnut brown and up to 8 cm long, with an indistinct ring.

The flesh is whitish, with a mild taste. The spore print is white.

== Habitat ==
It can be found in coniferous and deciduous woodlands, mostly singly or in small groups.

== Toxicity ==
Like several other species of the genus Lepiota, it contains potentially fatal amatoxins which affect the liver.

== See also ==
- List of deadly fungi
- List of Lepiota species
