= Amanullin =

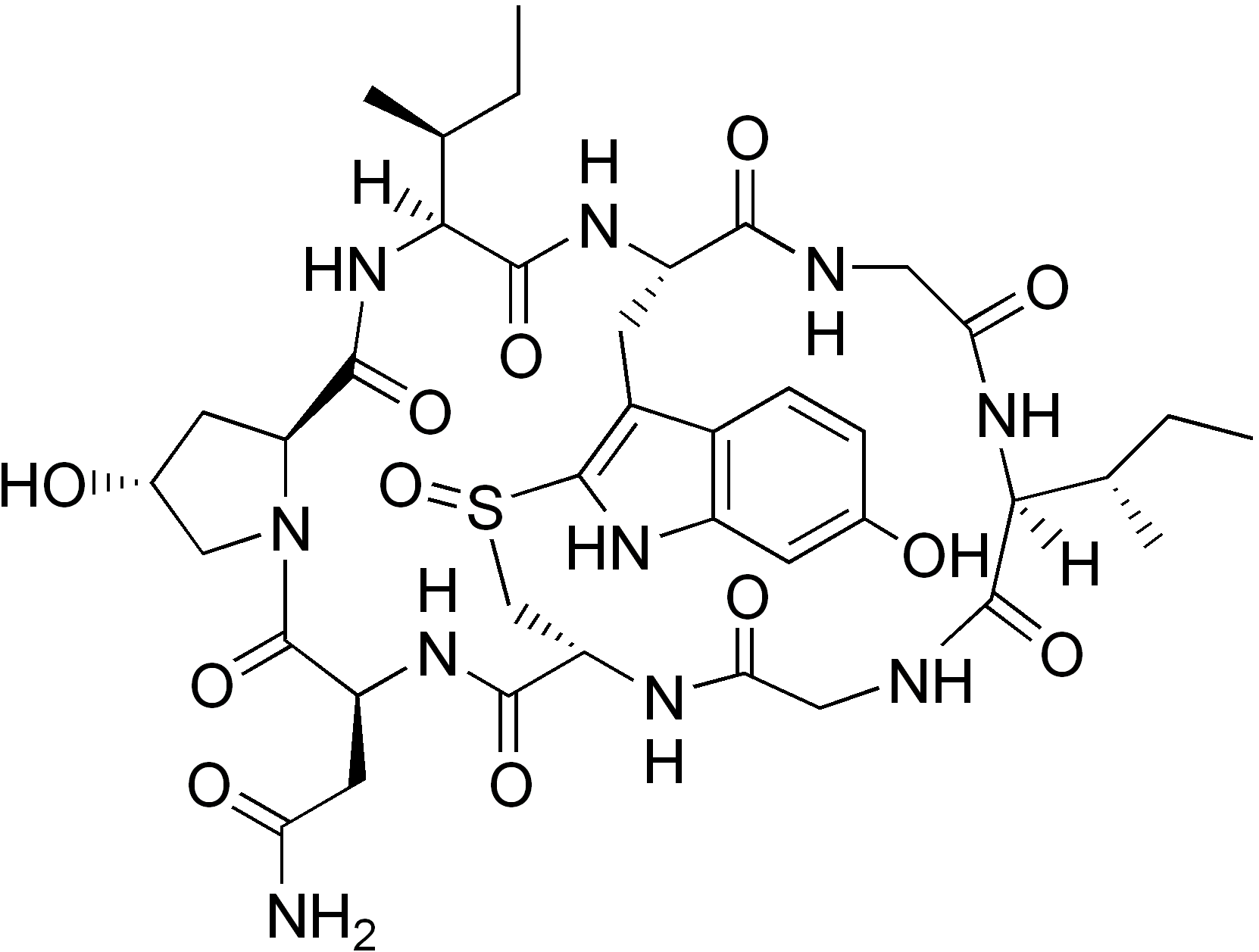

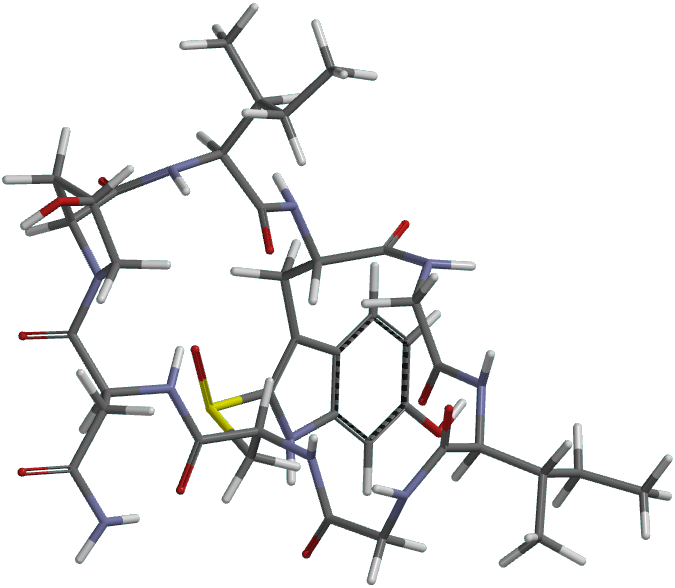

Names
- Other names 3-Isoleucine-alpha-amanitin

Identifiers
CAS Number	21803-57-6
3D model (JSmol)	Interactive image
ChemSpider	102814
PubChem CID	114856
CompTox Dashboard (EPA)	DTXSID801028140
- InChI: InChI=1S/C39H54N10O12S/c1-5-17(3)31-36(58)42-13-29(53)43-26-16-62(61)38-22(21-8-7-19(50)9-23(21)46-38)11-24(33(55)41-14-30(54)47-31)44-37(59)32(18(4)6-2)48-35(57)27-10-20(51)15-49(27)39(60)25(12-28(40)52)45-34(26)56/h7-9,17-18,20,24-27,31-32,46,50-51H,5-6,10-16H2,1-4H3,(H2,40,52)(H,41,55)(H,42,58)(H,43,53)(H,44,59)(H,45,56)(H,47,54)(H,48,57) Key: QQLVIKWYAVVKKF-UHFFFAOYSA-N
- SMILES: O=C(NCC(N[C@@](C(NCC(N[C@@H](C3)C(N[C@@H](CC(N)=O)C(N5[C@H]4C[C@@H](O)C5)=O)=O)=O)=O)([H])[C@@H](C)CC)=O)[C@H](CC1=C(S3=O)NC2=C1C=CC(O)=C2)NC([C@@]([C@@H](C)CC)([H])N[C@@]4=O)=O

Properties
Chemical formula	C_{39}H_{54}N_{10}O_{12}S
Molar mass	886.86 g/mol
Appearance	Colorless, crystalline solid
Solubility in water	Soluble
Solubility in ethanol, methanol	Soluble
- Except where otherwise noted, data are given for materials in their standard state (at 25 °C [77 °F], 100 kPa). verify (what is ?) Infobox references

Amanullin is a cyclic peptide. It is an amatoxin, all of which are found in several members of the mushroom genus Amanita. The oral LD_{50} of amanullin is approximately 20 mg/kg in mice; however, it is non-toxic in humans.

== Toxicology ==
Like other amatoxins, amanullin is an inhibitor of RNA polymerase II. Amanullin has a species dependent and specific attraction to the enzyme RNA polymerase II. Upon ingestion, it binds to the RNA polymerase II enzyme, effectively causing cytolysis of hepatocytes (liver cells).

== See also ==
- Mushroom poisoning
