= Proamanullin =

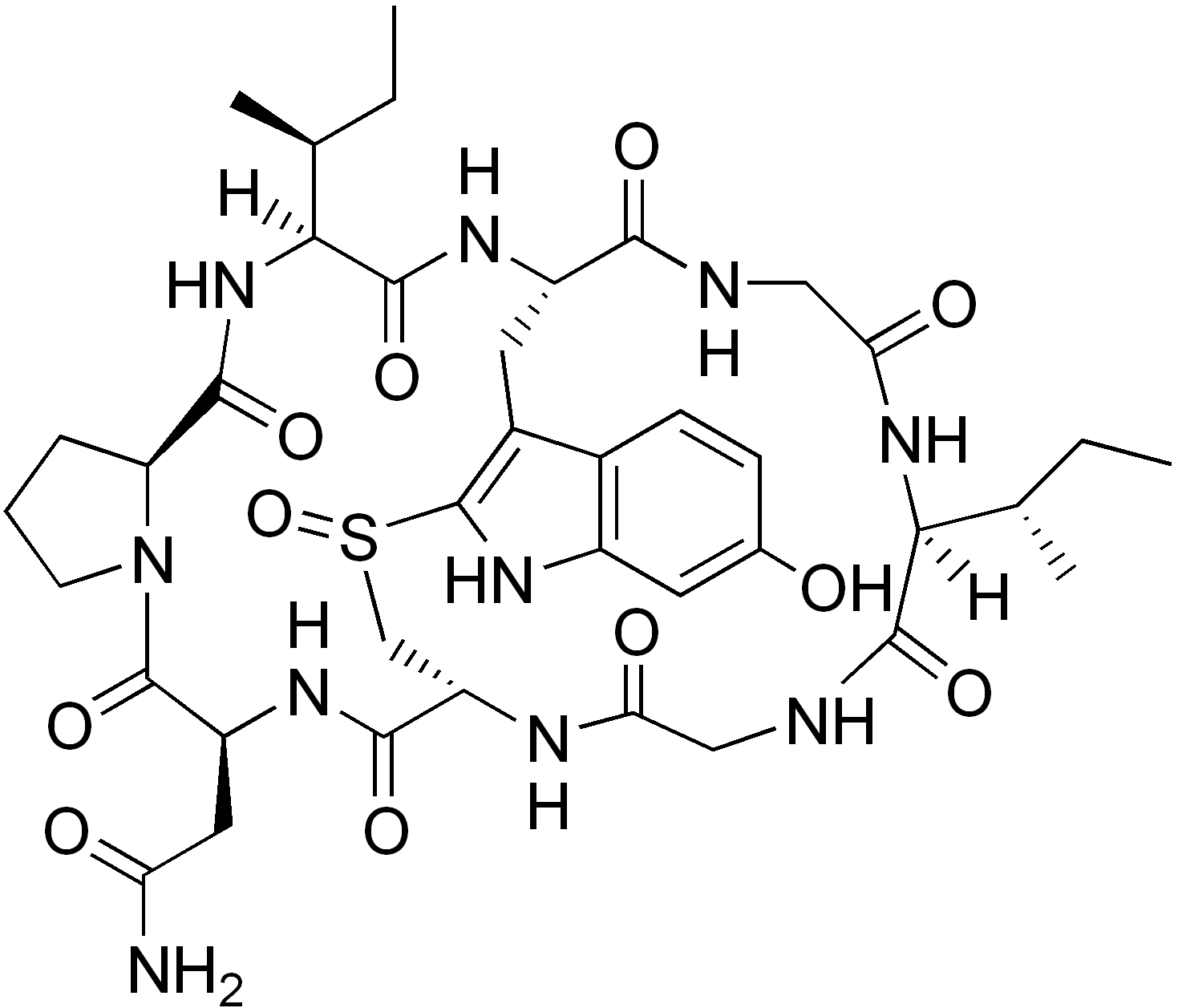

Names
- Other names 2-L-Proline-3-isoleucine-alpha-amanitin

Identifiers
CAS Number	54532-46-6
3D model (JSmol)	Interactive image
ChemSpider	48308194
PubChem CID	171350
CompTox Dashboard (EPA)	DTXSID501028141
- InChI: InChI=1S/C39H54N10O11S/c1-5-18(3)31-36(57)42-15-29(52)43-26-17-61(60)38-22(21-10-9-20(50)12-23(21)46-38)13-24(33(54)41-16-30(53)47-31)44-37(58)32(19(4)6-2)48-35(56)27-8-7-11-49(27)39(59)25(14-28(40)51)45-34(26)55/h9-10,12,18-19,24-27,31-32,46,50H,5-8,11,13-17H2,1-4H3,(H2,40,51)(H,41,54)(H,42,57)(H,43,52)(H,44,58)(H,45,55)(H,47,53)(H,48,56)/t18-,19-,24-,25-,26-,27-,31-,32-,61?/m0/s1 Key: CTYHFRWAIRSHQT-YRDOMICZSA-N; InChI=1/C39H54N10O11S/c1-5-18(3)31-36(57)42-15-29(52)43-26-17-61(60)38-22(21-10-9-20(50)12-23(21)46-38)13-24(33(54)41-16-30(53)47-31)44-37(58)32(19(4)6-2)48-35(56)27-8-7-11-49(27)39(59)25(14-28(40)51)45-34(26)55/h9-10,12,18-19,24-27,31-32,46,50H,5-8,11,13-17H2,1-4H3,(H2,40,51)(H,41,54)(H,42,57)(H,43,52)(H,44,58)(H,45,55)(H,47,53)(H,48,56)/t18-,19-,24-,25-,26-,27-,31-,32-,61?/m0/s1 Key: CTYHFRWAIRSHQT-YRDOMICZBU
- SMILES: O=C(NCC(N[C@@](C(NCC(N[C@@H](C3)C(N[C@@H](CC(N)=O)C(N5[C@H]4CCC5)=O)=O)=O)=O)([H])[C@@H](C)CC)=O)[C@H](CC1=C(S3=O)NC2=C1C=CC(O)=C2)NC([C@@]([C@@H](C)CC)([H])N[C@@]4=O)=O

Properties
Chemical formula	C_{39}H_{54}N_{10}O_{11}S
Molar mass	870.97 g/mol
Appearance	Colorless, odorless
- Except where otherwise noted, data are given for materials in their standard state (at 25 °C [77 °F], 100 kPa). verify (what is ?) Infobox references

Promanullin is a cyclic nonribosomal peptide. It is an amatoxin, all of which are found in the mushroom genus Amanita.

== Toxicology ==
Like other amatoxins, proamanullin is an inhibitor of RNA polymerase II. Promanullin has a specific attraction to the enzyme RNA polymerase II. Upon ingestion, it binds to the RNA polymerase II enzyme, effectively causing cytolysis of hepatocytes (liver cells).

== See also ==
- Mushroom poisoning
