= Halovir =

Group of chemical compounds

Halovir refers to a multi-analogue compound belonging to a group of oligopeptides designated as lipopeptaibols (chemical features including lipophilic acyl chain at the N-terminus, abundant α-aminoisobutyric acid content, and a 1,2-amino alcohol located at the C-terminus) which have membrane-modifying capacity and are fungal in origin. These peptides display interesting microheterogeneity; slight variation in encoding amino acids gives rise to a mixture of closely related analogues and have been shown to have antibacterial/antiviral properties.

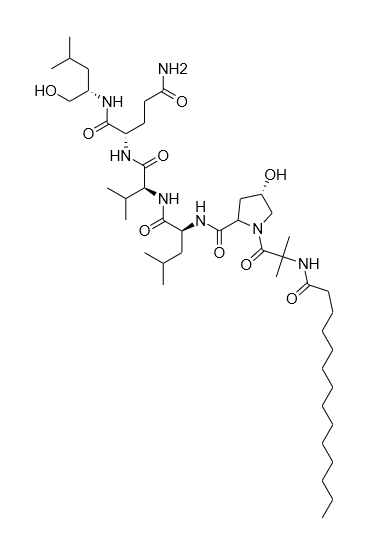

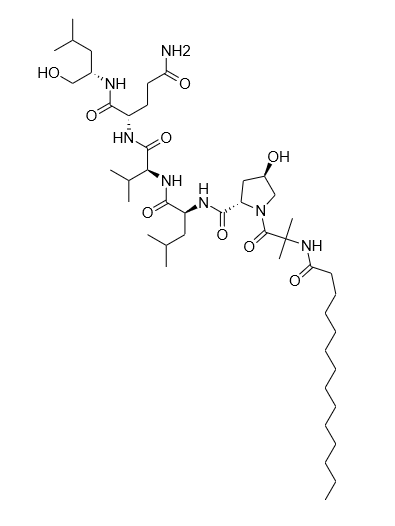

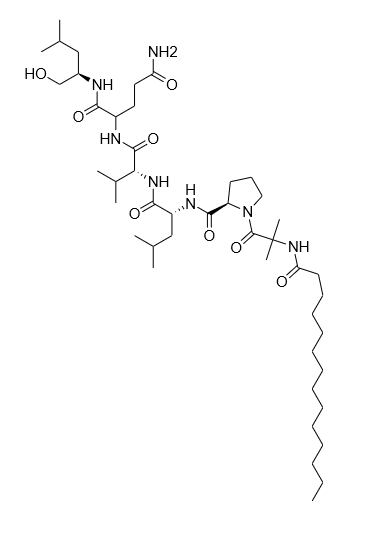

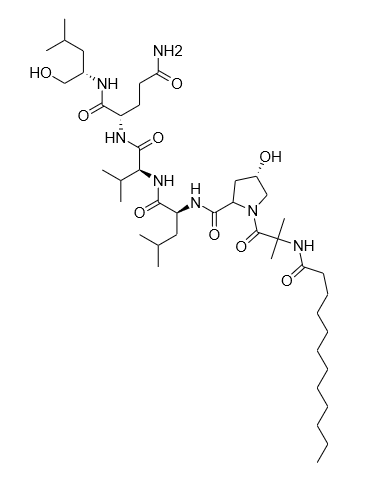

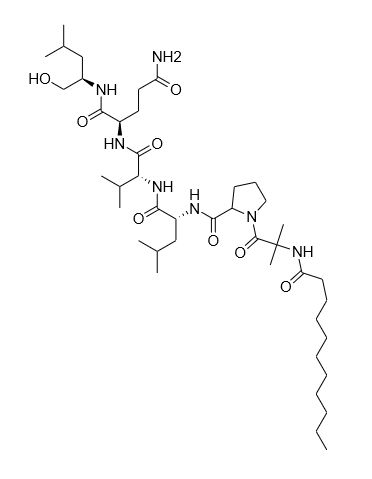

== Background ==
Nonribosomal peptides compose a significant group of secondary metabolites in bacterial/fungal organisms (though Drosophila melanogaster and Caenorhabditis elegans both exhibit products of nonribosomal peptide synthetases); having been observed functioning as self-defense substances/iron-chelating siderophores, they serve as coping mechanisms for environmental stress, perform as virulence factors/toxins promoting pathogenesis, and act in signalling (enabling communications within and between species). In lieu of these functionalities, many nonribosomal peptides have been utilized in development of medical drugs and biocontrol agents (examples of such include β-lactams, daptomycin, echinocandins, emodepside, bleomycin, cyclosporine, and bialaphos).

Peptaibols are a family of linear, amphipathic polypeptides (typically consisting of 4-21 amino acids residues) that are generated as a result of the assembly of a variety of aminoacyl, ketoacyl or hydroxyacyl monomers by fungal multimodular megaenzymes denoted as nonribosomal-peptide synthetases (NRPSs). Typically, NRPSs are composed of three highly conserved core domains: an adenylation (A) domain which recognizes, activates and loads monomers onto NRPS, a thiolation (T) domain (also denoted as the peptidyl carrier protein domain) that transports covalently linked monomers/peptidyl intermediates between nearby NRPS domains, and a condensation (C) domain (catalyzes sequential condensation of monomers within the nascent peptide chain). In addition, a chain-terminating domain [thioesterase (TE) domain, a terminal C (C_{T}) or a reductase (R) domain] is commonly observed at the end of an NRPS in order to relinquish full-length peptide chains in linear or cyclic forms. Furthermore, often seen are feature tailoring domains [epimerase, N-methyltransferase (M), oxidase (Ox), ketoacyl reductase (KR) and cyclase (Cy)], allowing for further modification of monomers/polypeptide intermediates.

Notable characteristics of peptaibols include: C-terminal alcohol residues (phenylalaninol, leucinol, isoleucinol, valinol), an N-acyl terminus (usually acetyl), and high levels of α,α-dialkylated non-proteinogenic amino acids [α-aminoisobutyric acid (Aib), isovaleric acid (Iva), hydroxyproline (Hyp)]. In most cases, peptaibols form α-helix and β-bend patterns in their 3D structures (α-aminoisobutyric acid is a turn/helix forming agent). α,α-dialkylated amino acid residues in peptaibols create substantial conformation constrictions in the peptide backbone, resulting in the formation of right-handed α-helical structures. Membrane modification abilities can be attributed to the formation of transmembrane voltage-dependent channels; this occurs as the peptide takes on an α-helical conformation upon contact of lipid bilayers, drilling through and forming ion channels with similar electrophysiological configurations of ion channel proteins. The principle functionality of the peptides is to rupture membranes, in turn triggering cytolysis via loss of osmotic balance.

Structurally speaking, lipopeptaibols are peptaibols with a fatty acyl moiety linked to the N-terminal amino acid (thusly named), and have been isolated from a number of soil fungi. Their primary structures all have the L-(S-) configuration at the 2-(α-)carbon. They overwhelmingly display microheterogeneity (being very structurally similar; with a limited pool of conserved variation in natural sample).

== Structure ==
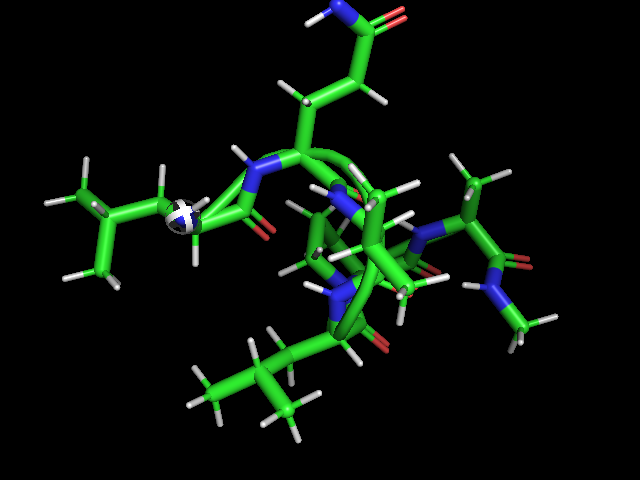
Approximate modeling of Halovir A peptide sequence (without myristoyl tail) using PyMOL 2.5

$\ce{C45H83N7O9}$-Halovir A: contains L-leucine, L-valine, and L-glutamine

$\ce{C43H79N7O9}$-Halovir B: contains L-alanine, L-leucine, L-glutamine

$\ce{C45H83N7O8}$-Halovir C: contains L-leucine, L-valine, L-glutamine,

$\ce{C43H79N7O9}$-Halovir D

$\ce{C43H79N7O8}$-Halovir E

$\ce{C42H77N7O8}$-Halovir I

$\ce{C44H79N7O9}$-Halovir J

$\ce{C43H78N7O9}$-Halovir K

== Medical applications ==
The antibiotic capabilities of these compounds can be attributed to membrane insertion and pore-forming functionalities, and typically exhibit antimicrobial activity in Gram-positive bacteria and fungi.

Halovirs A-E (isolated from Scytidium sp.) has displayed potent antiviral activity against HSV-1, and has been observed performing replication inhibition of HSV-1 and HSV-2 in standard plaque reduction assay without cytotoxicity (at concentrations upwards of 0.85μM) Mechanistic studies suggest that halovirs kills virus in direct contact and in a time-dependent manner before it can affect host cells.

Halovirs I and J were analyzed for antibacterial and cytotoxic activities, and displayed significant growth inhibition against two Gram-positive bacteria (Staphylococcus aureus and Enterococcus faecium), but not Gram-negative Escherichia coli. Notably, these two halovirs were found to be effective against methicillin-resistant S. aureus (MRSA) and vancomycin-resistant E. faeccium, indicating that the activity against them to be persistent. Additionally, strong cytotoxic activity was observed against a panel of cancer cell lines, including: human lung carinoma A549, human breast carcinoma MCF-7, and human cervical carcinoma HeLa cells (cytotoxicity was not specific to cancer cells in the referenced study).
