= Β-Amanitin =

Cyclic peptide part of a group of toxins present in Amanita mushrooms

β-Amanitin
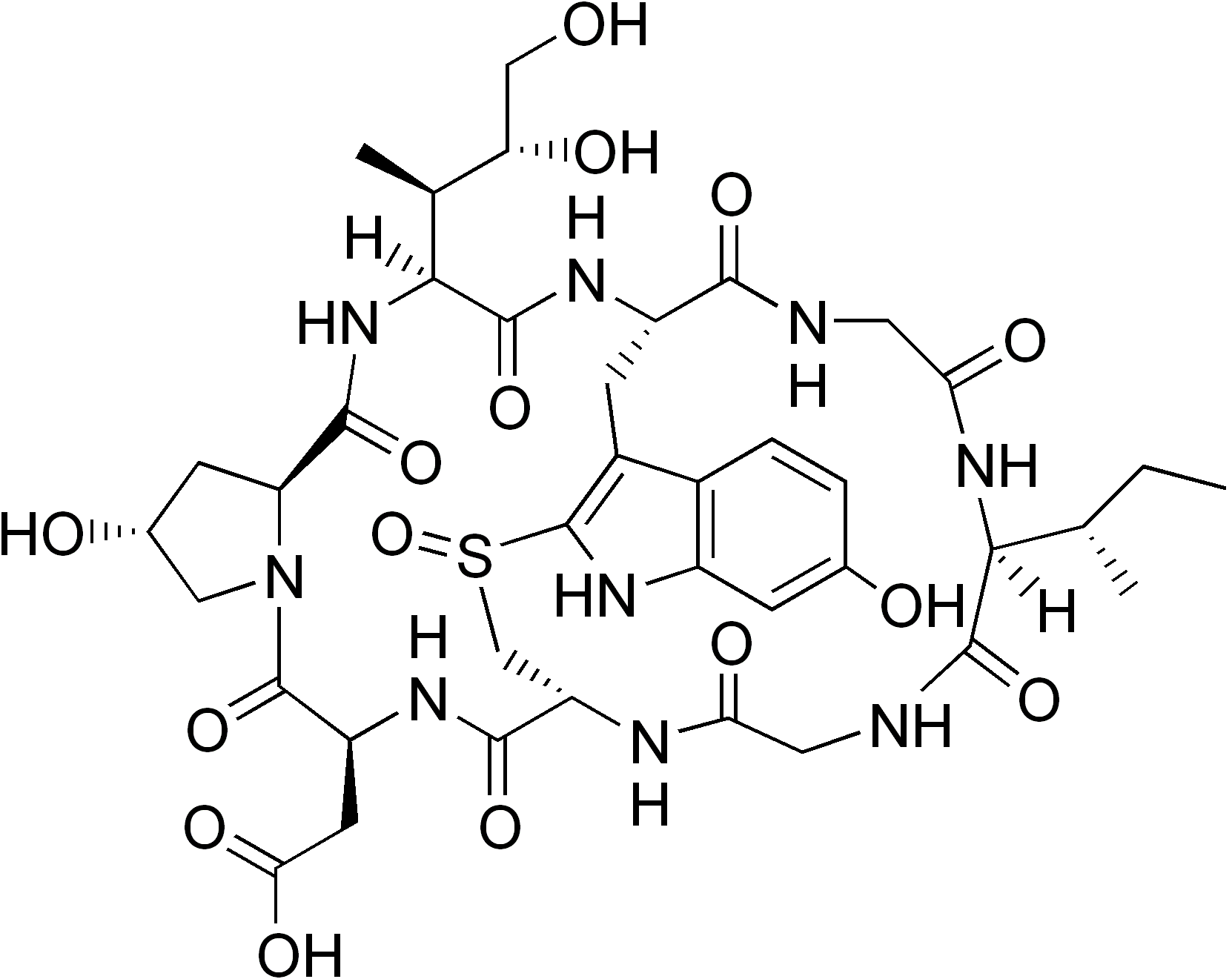

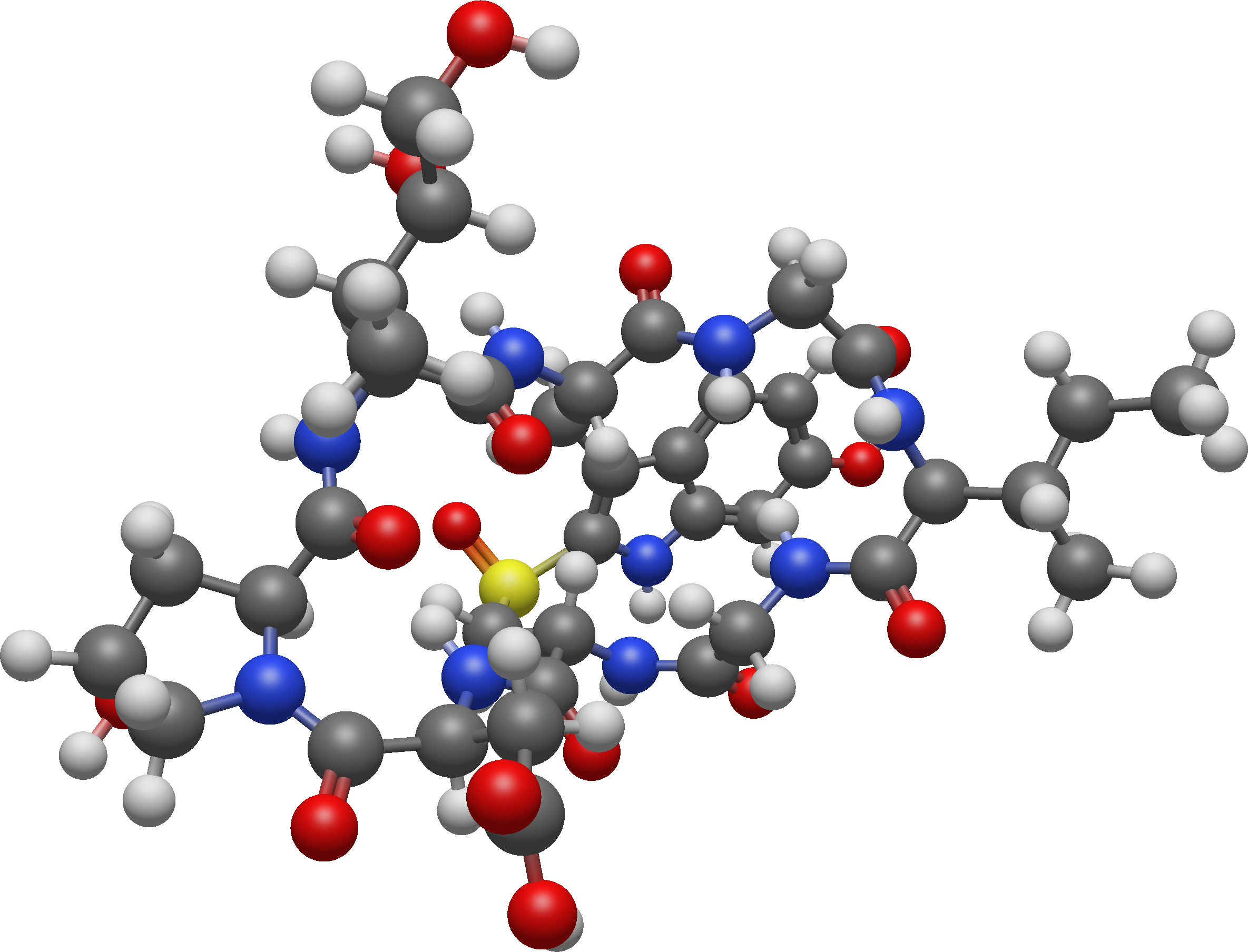

Identifiers
CAS Number	21150-22-1
3D model (JSmol)	Interactive image
ChemSpider	26234939
ECHA InfoCard	100.040.207
PubChem CID	2276
UNII	G729YPP47L
CompTox Dashboard (EPA)	DTXSID50897720
- InChI: InChI=1S/C39H53N9O15S/c1-4-16(2)31-36(60)41-11-28(53)42-25-15-64(63)38-21(20-6-5-18(50)7-22(20)45-38)9-23(33(57)40-12-29(54)46-31)43-37(61)32(17(3)27(52)14-49)47-35(59)26-8-19(51)13-48(26)39(62)24(10-30(55)56)44-34(25)58/h5-7,16-17,19,23-27,31-32,45,49-52H,4,8-15H2,1-3H3,(H,40,57)(H,41,60)(H,42,53)(H,43,61)(H,44,58)(H,46,54)(H,47,59)(H,55,56)/t16-,17-,19+,23-,24-,25-,26-,27-,31-,32-,64?/m0/s1 Key: IEQCUEXVAPAFMQ-JAXJKTSHSA-N; InChI=1/C39H53N9O15S/c1-4-16(2)31-36(60)41-11-28(53)42-25-15-64(63)38-21(20-6-5-18(50)7-22(20)45-38)9-23(33(57)40-12-29(54)46-31)43-37(61)32(17(3)27(52)14-49)47-35(59)26-8-19(51)13-48(26)39(62)24(10-30(55)56)44-34(25)58/h5-7,16-17,19,23-27,31-32,45,49-52H,4,8-15H2,1-3H3,(H,40,57)(H,41,60)(H,42,53)(H,43,61)(H,44,58)(H,46,54)(H,47,59)(H,55,56)/t16-,17-,19+,23-,24-,25-,26-,27-,31-,32-,64?/m0/s1 Key: IEQCUEXVAPAFMQ-JAXJKTSHBD
- SMILES: O=C(NCC(N[C@@](C(NCC(N[C@@H](C3)C(N[C@@H](CC(O)=O)C(N5[C@H]4C[C@@H](O)C5)=O)=O)=O)=O)([H])[C@@H](C)CC)=O)[C@H](CC1=C(S3=O)NC2=C1C=CC(O)=C2)NC([C@@]([C@@H](C)[C@@H](O)CO)([H])N[C@@]4=O)=O

Properties
Chemical formula	C_{39}H_{53}N_{9}O_{15}S
Molar mass	919.95 g/mol
- Except where otherwise noted, data are given for materials in their standard state (at 25 °C [77 °F], 100 kPa). verify (what is ?) Infobox references

β-Amanitin (beta-Amanitin) is a cyclic peptide comprising eight amino acids. It is part of a group of toxins called amatoxins, which can be found in several mushrooms belonging to the genus Amanita. Some examples are the death cap (Amanita phalloides) and members of the destroying angel complex, which includes A. virosa and A. bisporigera. Due to the presence of α-Amanitin, β-Amanitin, γ-Amanitin and epsilon-Amanitin these mushrooms are highly lethal to human beings.

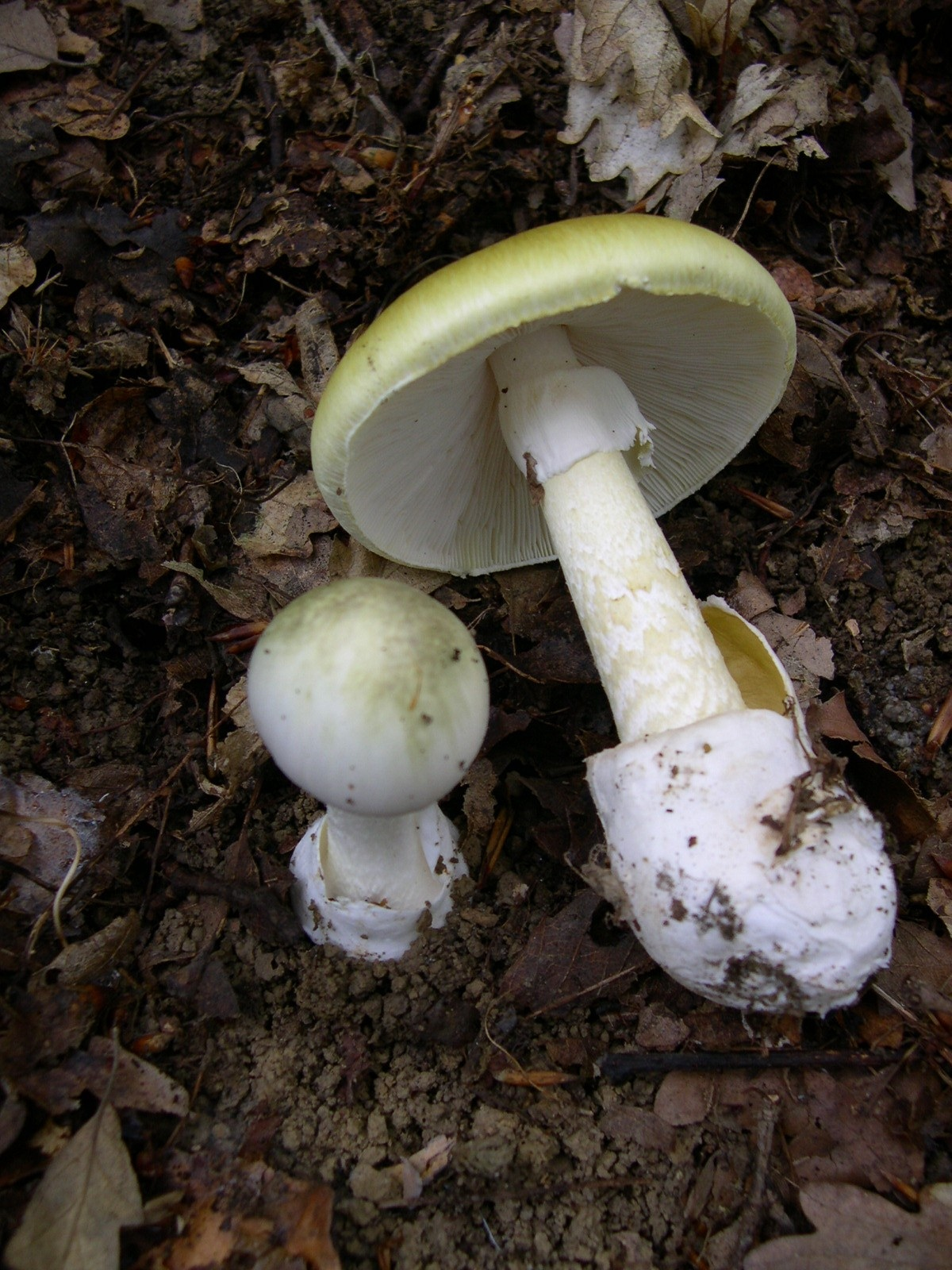
Amanita phalloides

== Toxicity ==
The lethal dose of amanitoxins is 0.1 mg/kg of body weight of humans. The average Amanita mushroom contains 3–5 mg of amanitoxins, so one 40–50 g mushroom could kill an average adult. The U.S. Occupational Safety and Health Administration (OSHA) permits a time-weighted average exposure of up to 5 mg/m^{3} of β-Amanitin dust.

=== Symptoms of exposure ===
β-Amanitin may cause irritation of the respiratory tract, headache, dizziness, nausea, shortness of breath, coughing, insomnia, diarrhea, gastrointestinal disturbances, back pain, urinary frequency, liver and kidney damage, or death if ingested or inhaled. If β-Amanitin comes in contact with skin, it may cause irritation, burns, redness, severe pain, and could be absorbed through the skin, causing similar effects to exposure via inhalation and ingestion. Contact with the eyes may result in irritation, corneal burns, and eye damage. Persons with pre-existing skin, eye, or central nervous systems disorders, impaired liver, kidney, or pulmonary function may be more susceptible to the effects of this substance.

== Physiological mechanism of action ==
β-Amanitin is able to travel through the bloodstream to reach the organs in the body. While it damages all organs, damage to the liver and heart result in fatalities. At the molecular level amanitin toxins cause damage to cells of these organs. The toxins may also cause disruptions in the plasma membranes resulting in organelles that are normally in the cytoplasm to be found in the extracellular matrix. beta-Amanitin is also an inhibitor of eukaryotic RNA polymerase II and RNA polymerase III, and as a result, mammalian protein synthesis. It has not been found to inhibit RNA polymerase I or bacterial RNA polymerase. Because it inactivates the RNA polymerases, the liver is unable to repair the damage that beta-Amanitin causes and the cells of the liver disintegrate and the liver dissolves.

== Scientific analysis ==
Due to its lethality and its widespread presence in the genus Amanita, which is found across the globe, β-Amanitin has been extensively studied in the field of protein biochemistry. In particular, William Lipscomb, Nobel laureate, greatly contributed to characterizing this protein. Not only did Lipscomb determine how to successfully retrieve and purify this life-threatening protein, but he also determined the molecular structure by X-ray crystallography in a time before this technique was widely utilized.

=== Collection and purification ===
Due to its extreme lethality, as well as it being only commercially available at certain times and then at an extremely high cost, Amanita phalloides had to be retrieved from the wild in order to collect the β-Amanitin protein. This was first achieved by collecting A. phalloides fruiting bodies in New Jersey in 1975. These mushrooms were then dried for 24 hours and then ground in a blender with water. The slurry created was homogenized further to break open any intact cells, and after this a brown syrup extract containing the toxins was collected. This extract was then taken through various separation methods to isolate the toxins themselves. The toxins were then desalted and taken through four different methods of sephadex and acidic protein purification.

=== Crystallization ===
The structure of β-Amanitin was determined using X-ray crystallography. The crystallization and analysis were performed by Edward C. Kostansek and William H. Lipscomb in 1978. They crystallized β-Amanitin by dissolving a purified sample in almost pure ethanol in a round bottom flask. The flask was left open overnight and crystals formed as the ethanol evaporated. This is considered to be an incredibly easy crystallization to perform.

== See also ==
- Mushroom poisoning
