= Amanullinic acid =

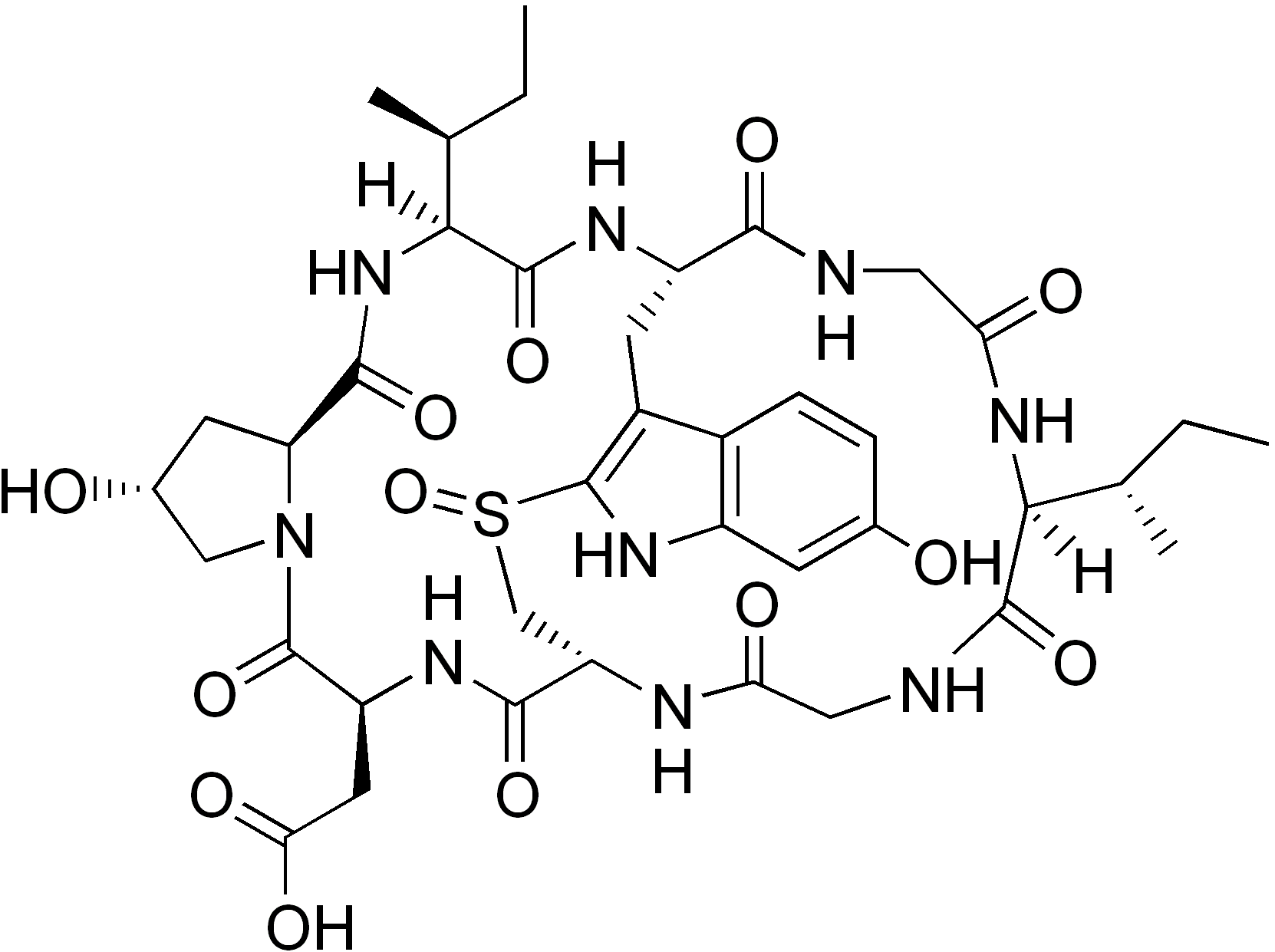

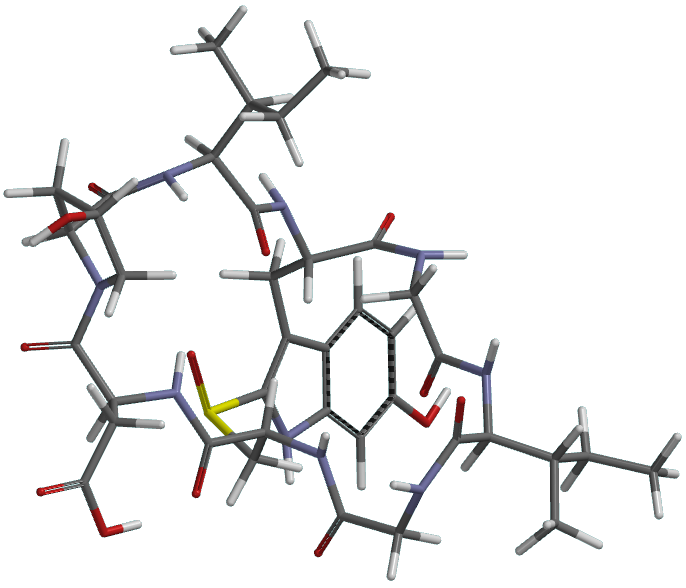

Names
- Other names 1-L-Aspartic acid-3-isoleucine-alpha-amanitin

Identifiers
CAS Number	54532-45-5
3D model (JSmol)	Interactive image
ChemSpider	149798
PubChem CID	171349
- InChI: InChI=1S/C39H53N9O13S/c1-5-17(3)31-36(58)41-13-28(51)42-26-16-62(61)38-22(21-8-7-19(49)9-23(21)45-38)11-24(33(55)40-14-29(52)46-31)43-37(59)32(18(4)6-2)47-35(57)27-10-20(50)15-48(27)39(60)25(12-30(53)54)44-34(26)56/h7-9,17-18,20,24-27,31-32,45,49-50H,5-6,10-16H2,1-4H3,(H,40,55)(H,41,58)(H,42,51)(H,43,59)(H,44,56)(H,46,52)(H,47,57)(H,53,54) Key: HFENEIQMWRYNGK-UHFFFAOYSA-N; InChI=1/C39H53N9O13S/c1-5-17(3)31-36(58)41-13-28(51)42-26-16-62(61)38-22(21-8-7-19(49)9-23(21)45-38)11-24(33(55)40-14-29(52)46-31)43-37(59)32(18(4)6-2)47-35(57)27-10-20(50)15-48(27)39(60)25(12-30(53)54)44-34(26)56/h7-9,17-18,20,24-27,31-32,45,49-50H,5-6,10-16H2,1-4H3,(H,40,55)(H,41,58)(H,42,51)(H,43,59)(H,44,56)(H,46,52)(H,47,57)(H,53,54) Key: HFENEIQMWRYNGK-UHFFFAOYAM
- SMILES: O=C(NCC(N[C@@](C(NCC(N[C@@H](C3)C(N[C@@H](CC(O)=O)C(N5[C@H]4C[C@@H](O)C5)=O)=O)=O)=O)([H])[C@@H](C)CC)=O)[C@H](CC1=C(S3=O)NC2=C1C=CC(O)=C2)NC([C@@]([C@@H](C)CC)([H])N[C@@]4=O)=O

Properties
Chemical formula	C_{39}H_{53}N_{9}O_{13}S
Molar mass	887.96 g/mol
- Except where otherwise noted, data are given for materials in their standard state (at 25 °C [77 °F], 100 kPa). verify (what is ?) Infobox references

Amanullinic acid is a cyclic nonribosomal peptide. It is an amatoxin, all of which are found in several members of the mushroom genus Amanita. Amanullinic acid is relatively non-toxic( oral LD_{50} >20 mg/kg in mice).

== Toxicology ==
Like other amatoxins, amanullinic acid is an inhibitor of RNA polymerase II.

== See also ==
- Mushroom poisoning
