= Cyanopeptolin =

Poisonous biological substance

Cyanopeptolins (CPs) are a class of oligopeptides produced by Microcystis and Planktothrix algae strains, and can be neurotoxic. The production of cyanopeptolins occurs through nonribosomal peptides synthases (NRPS).

== Chemistry ==
CPs are, in general, a six-residue peptide formed into a ring by a beta-lactone bridge, making them chemically depsipeptides (peptidolactones). The first position is usually threonine, which links to one or two residues via an ester bound on the beta-hydroxyl group; the third position is conserved to be 3-amino-6-hydroxy-2-piperidone (Ahp) or a derivative. All other positions are highly variable.

There is not a single, unified nomenclature, for CPs. Names such as CP1020 and CP1138 refer to the molar mass. Others, such as aeruginopeptins, micropeptins, microcystilide, nostopeptins, and oscillapeptins, refer to the organism the substance is originally found in.

== Factors affecting production ==
Increased water temperatures, because of climate change and eutrophication of inland waters promote blooms of cyanobacteria, potentially threaten water contamination by the production of the toxic cyanopeptolin CP1020.

== Biological activity ==
Most CPs are serine protease inhibitors.

Cyanopeptolin CP1020 exposure in zebrafish affected pathways related to DNA damage, the circadian rhythm and response to light.

== Evolutionary history ==
CPs are probably very ancient: the cyanobacterial genera that produce CPs appear to have inherited the key modules vertically and not horizontally.

== See also ==
- Cyanotoxin
- Microviridin
- Microcystin
