= Microviridin =

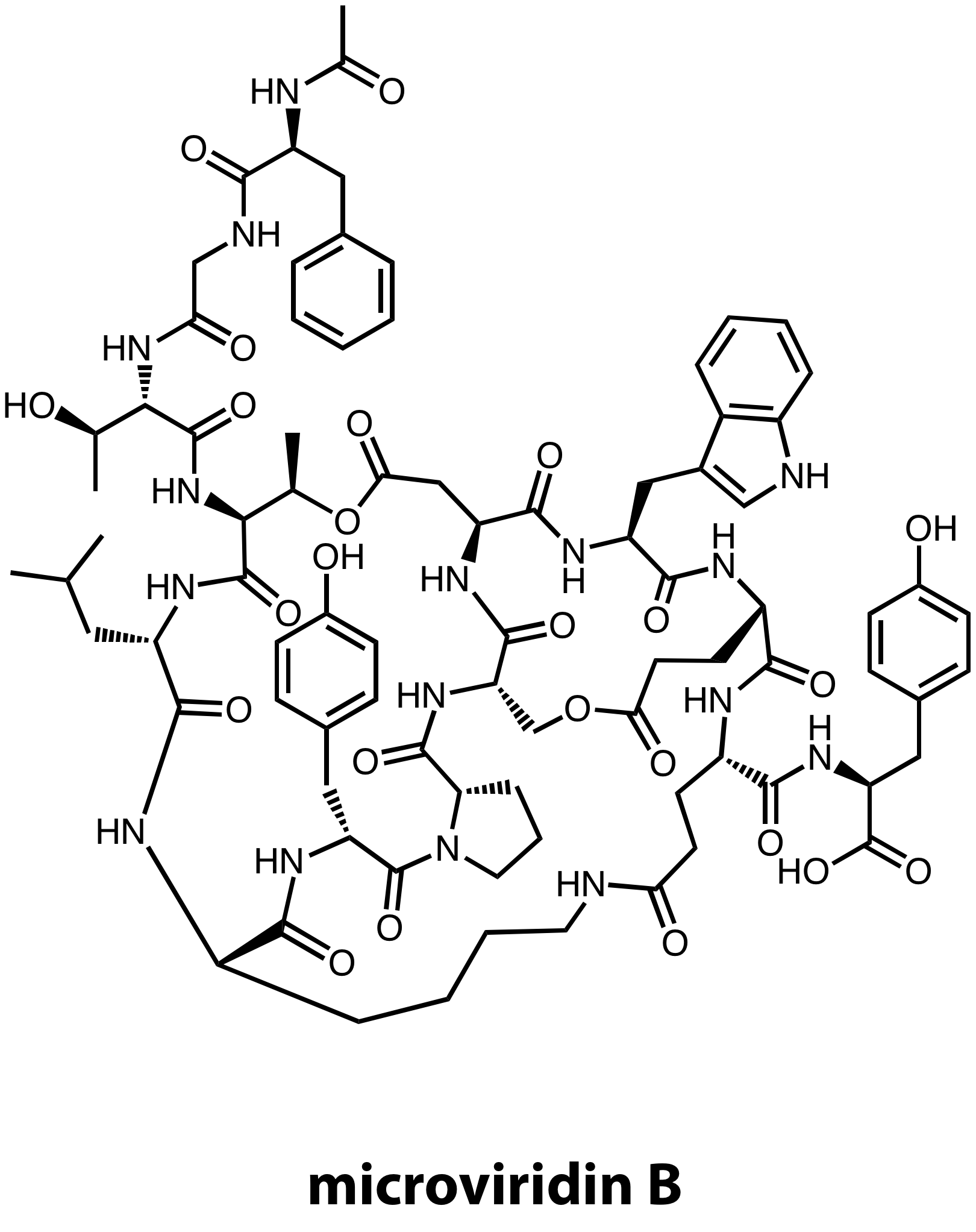
The structure of microviridin B

The microviridins are a class of serine protease inhibitors produced by various genera of cyanobacteria. Recent genome mining has shown that the biosynthetic gene cluster responsible for microviridin biosynthesis is much more prevalent, found in many species of Pseudomonadota (formerly Proteobacteria) and Bacteriodota (formerly Bacteriodetes).

Microviridins are members of the RiPP family of natural products.

The first microviridin was isolated from Microcystis viridis (NIES-102) and its structure was reported in 1990. Microviridins are characterized by a tricyclic depsipeptide structure resulting from the enzymatic activity of two dedicated ATP-grasp ligases, which form two lactone and one lactam rings in the core region of the precursor peptide.

== Toxicity ==
Microviridin J has been found to disrupt molting in the invertebrate Daphnia pulicaria, probably as a result of its protease inhibitory effects

== See also ==
- Cyanotoxin
- Cyanopeptolin
