= Oligoester =

An oligoester is an ester oligomer chain containing a small number of repeating ester units (monomers). Oligoesters are short analogs of polymeric polyesters.

An example is oligo-(R)-3-hydroxybutyrate.

== See also ==
- Oligopeptide
