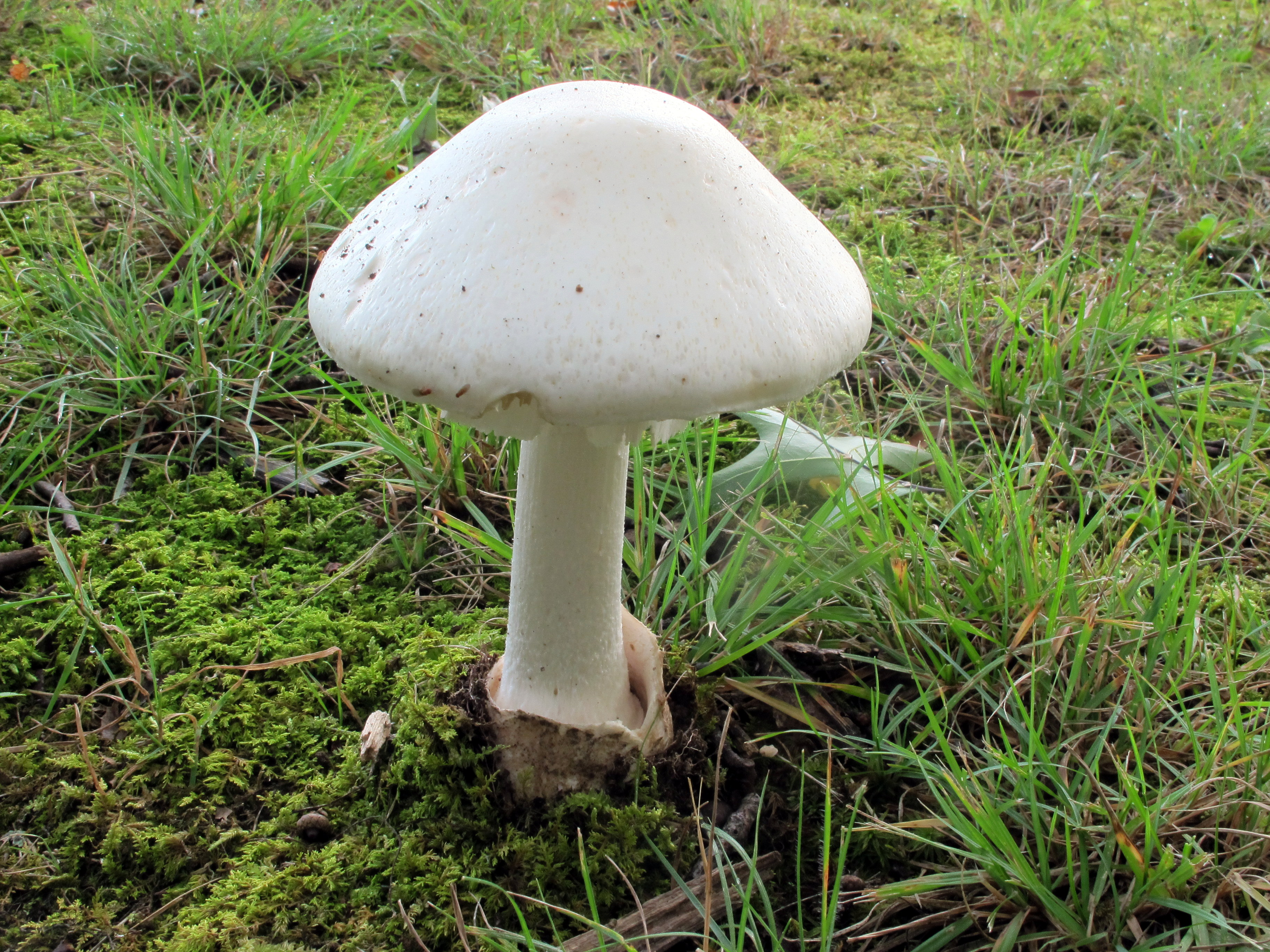

Scientific classification
- Kingdom: Fungi
- Division: Basidiomycota
- Class: Agaricomycetes
- Order: Agaricales
- Family: Amanitaceae
- Genus: Amanita
- Species: A. suballiacea

Binomial name
- Amanita suballiacea (Murrill) Murrill 1941

= Amanita suballiacea =

Species of fungus

Amanita suballiacea is a species of Amanita found in US coast of the Gulf of Mexico occurring with Quercus and Pinus.
