= Amatoxin =

Family of toxins

Amatoxins are a subgroup of at least nine related cyclic peptide toxins found in three genera of deadly poisonous mushrooms (Amanita, Galerina and Lepiota) and one species of the genus Pholiotina. Amatoxins are very potent, since as little as half a mushroom cap can cause severe liver injury if swallowed.

== Structure ==
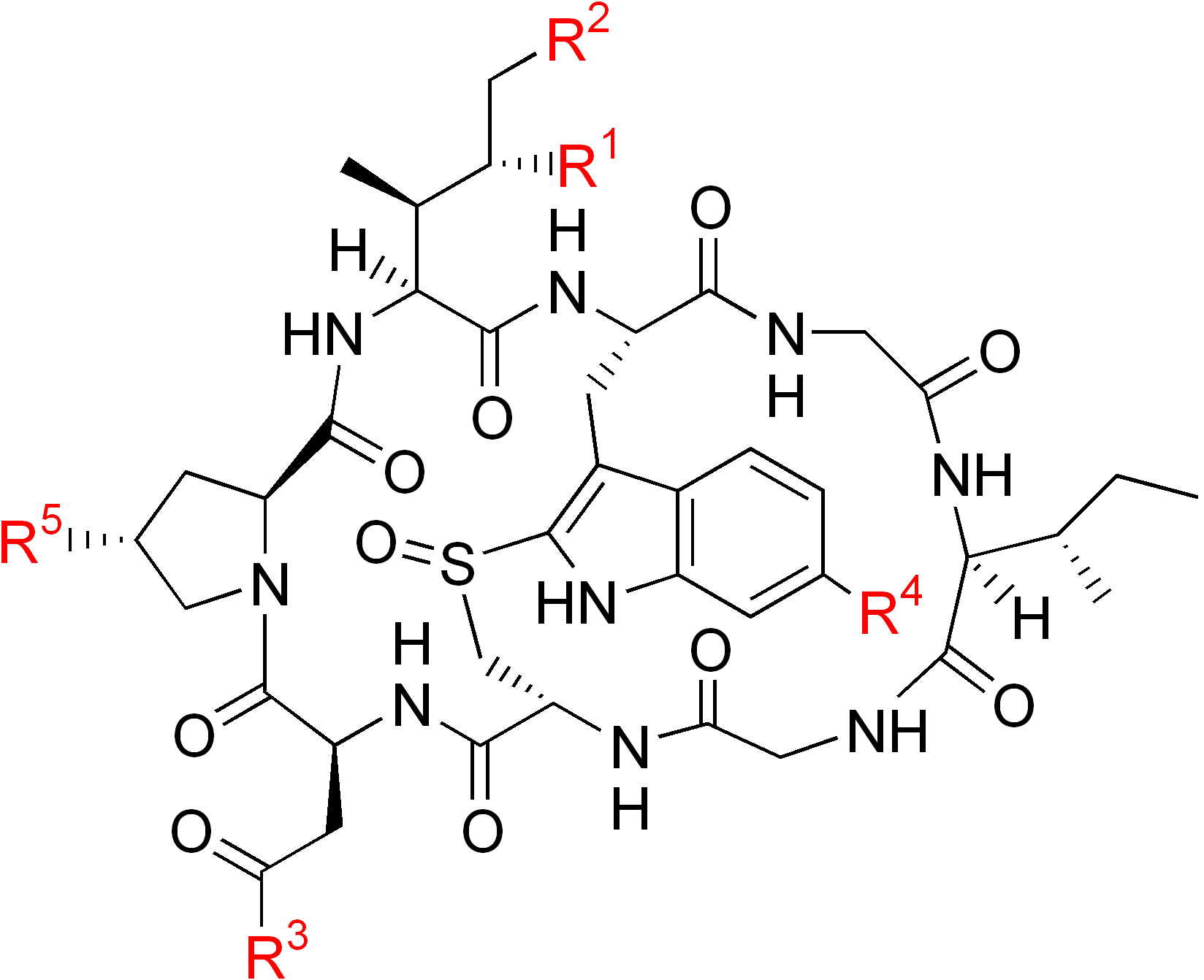
The backbone structure (black) is the same in all the amatoxins and five variable groups (red) determine the specific compound.

The compounds have a similar structure, that of eight amino-acid residues arranged in a conserved macrobicyclic motif (an overall pentacyclic structure when counting the rings inherent in the proline and tryptophan-derived residues); they were isolated in 1941 by Heinrich O. Wieland and Rudolf Hallermayer. All amatoxins are cyclic peptides that are synthesized as 35-amino-acid proproteins, from which the final eight amino acids are cleaved by a prolyl oligopeptidase. The schematic amino acid sequence of amatoxins is Ile-Trp-Gly-Ile-Gly-Cys-Asn-Pro with cross-linking between Trp and Cys via the sulfoxide (S=O) moiety and hydroxylation in variants of the molecule; enzymes for these processing steps remain unknown.

There are ten known amatoxins as of 1993:

Name	R^{1}	R^{2}	R^{3}	R^{4}	R^{5}
α-Amanitin	OH	OH	NH_{2}	OH	OH
β-Amanitin	OH	OH	OH	OH	OH
γ-Amanitin	OH	H	NH_{2}	OH	OH
ε-Amanitin	OH	H	OH	OH	OH
Amanullin	H	H	NH_{2}	OH	OH
Amanullinic acid	H	H	OH	OH	OH
Amaninamide	OH	OH	NH_{2}	H	OH
Amanin	OH	OH	OH	H	OH
Proamanullin	H	H	NH_{2}	OH	H

δ-Amanitin has been reported, but its chemical structure has not been determined.

A 2026 study on the mushroom Galerina indica found it to produce an amatoxin identical to α-amanitin in four locations but missing the OH group at R5, which the authors named α-proamanitin.

=== Family relations ===
Amanitin/phalloidin precursor

Identifiers
- Symbol: Amanitin/phalloidin
- InterPro: IPR027582
Available protein structures:
- PDB: IPR027582
- AlphaFold: IPR027582

Amanitin is very closely related to phalloidins, which are bicyclic 7-residue toxins. They both are part of the MSDIN protein family, so named after the highly conserved 5-amino-acid sequence in the preproteins. A 2014 research study determined that there exists a significant number of uncharacterized MSDIN sequences in Amanita genomes.

== Mechanism ==
Amatoxins are potent and selective inhibitors of RNA polymerase II (RNA Pol II), a vital enzyme in the synthesis of messenger RNA (mRNA), microRNA, and small nuclear RNA (snRNA). Without mRNA, which is the template for protein synthesis, cell metabolism stops and apoptosis ensues. The RNA polymerase of Amanita phalloides has mutations that make it insensitive to the effects of amatoxins; thus, the mushroom does not poison itself.

Amatoxins are able to travel through the bloodstream to reach the organs in the body. While these compounds can damage many organs, damage to the liver and heart result in fatalities. At the molecular level, amatoxins cause damage to cells of these organs by causing perforations in the plasma membranes resulting in misplaced organelles that are normally in the cytoplasm to be found in the extracellular matrix. beta-Amanitin is also an inhibitor of eukaryotic RNA polymerase II and RNA polymerase III, and as a result, mammalian protein synthesis. It has not been found to inhibit RNA polymerase I or bacterial RNA polymerase. Because it inactivates the RNA polymerases, the liver is unable to repair damage and the cells of the liver die off quickly.

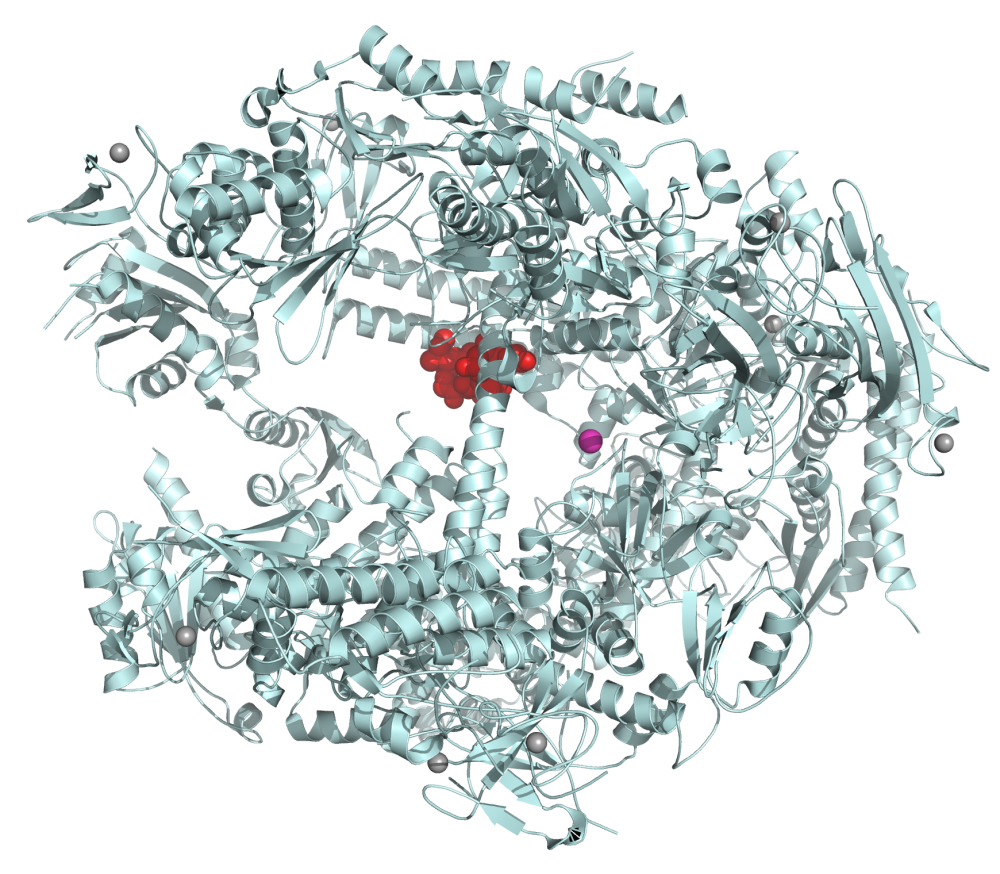
α-Amanitin (red) bound to RNA polymerase II from Saccharomyces cerevisiae (brewer's yeast). From PDB: 1K83.

Alpha-amanitin (α-Amanitin) primarily affects the bridge helix of the RNA pol II complex, a highly conserved domain 35 amino acids long. At the N-terminus and the C-terminus of this region there are hinge structures that undergo significant conformational changes throughout the nucleotide addition cycle, and are essential for its progression. One of the many roles of the bridge helix is facilitating the translocation of DNA. Alpha-amanitin binds to the bridge helix of the RNA Pol II complex and it also binds to part of the complex that is adjacent to the bridge helix, while it is in one specific conformation. This binding locks the bridge helix into place, dramatically slowing its movement in translocating the DNA. The rate of pol II translocation of DNA is reduced from several thousand to a few nucleotides per minute.

== Symptoms of exposure ==
Upon exposure to amatoxins, the liver is the principal organ affected as it is the organ which is first encountered after absorption in the gastrointestinal tract. There is no evidence that amatoxins are absorbed through skin. One study done on mice shows that alpha-Amanitin is not absorbed through skin and therefore cannot have any toxic effects. More specifically, exposure to amatoxins may cause irritation of the respiratory tract, headache, dizziness, nausea, shortness of breath, coughing, insomnia, diarrhea, gastrointestinal disturbances, back pain, urinary frequency, liver and kidney damage, or death if ingested or inhaled. For β-amanitin, there has been no full toxicological study. However, safety data sheets indicate that if it comes in contact with skin, it may cause irritation, burns, redness, severe pain, and could be absorbed through the skin, causing similar effects to exposure via inhalation and ingestion. Contact with the eyes may result in irritation, corneal burns, and eye damage. Persons with pre-existing skin, eye, or central nervous systems disorders, impaired liver, kidney, or pulmonary function may be more susceptible to the effects of this substance.

The estimated minimum lethal dose is 0.1 mg/kg or 7 to 10 milligrams of toxin in adults. Their swift intestinal absorption coupled with their thermostability leads to rapid development of toxic effects in a relatively short period of time. The most severe effects are toxic hepatitis with centrolobular necrosis and hepatic steatosis, as well as acute tubulointerstitial nephropathy, which altogether induce severe liver failure and kidney failure.

== Treatment ==
There are many anecdotal and partially-studied treatments in use worldwide. One study in mice showed null results for all studied treatments. Treatments showing no discernable value included N-acetylcysteine, benzylpenicillin, cimetidine, thioctic acid, and silybin.

Treatment involves high-dose penicillin as well as supportive care in cases of hepatic and renal injury. Silibinin, a product found in milk thistle, is a potential antidote to amatoxin poisoning, although more data needs to be collected. Cautious attention is given to maintaining hemodynamic stability, although if hepatorenal syndrome has developed the prognosis is guarded at best.

== Detection ==
Presence of amatoxins in mushroom samples may be detected by the Meixner test (also known as the Wieland test). The amatoxins may be quantitated in plasma or urine using chromatographic techniques to confirm a diagnosis of poisoning in hospitalized patients and in postmortem tissues to aid in a medicolegal investigation of a suspected fatal overdosage.

In 2020, a monoclonal antibody-based lateral flow immunoassay has been developed that can quickly and selectively detect amatoxins. This test sensitively detects alpha-amanitin and gamma-amanitin (clearly detects 10 ng/mL), and exhibits slightly less detection for beta-amanitin (0.5% cross-reactivity; 2000 ng/mL). Although this test cross-reacts with phallotoxins at 0.005% (200,000 ng/mL), the phallotoxins would not interfere in urine sampling and there are very rare instances where a mushroom produces phallotoxins without producing amatoxins.

== Studies ==
In a 2013 study on the toxin concentration in Amanita phalloides, all parts of the mushroom were found to contain amatoxins and it was determined that the highest concentrations were found in the gills and cap with the lowest levels in the spores and mycelium. An additional study published in 2013 by many of the same authors found no difference in the ITS sequence of Amanita phalloides var. alba but did find different concentrations of toxins. The gills and cap of Amanita phalloides var. alba also contained the highest level with very low levels noted in the spores, volva and stipe however in this variant the spores had a higher concentration of all toxins besides gamma amanitin than was found in Amanita phalloides. The spores of Amanita phalloides var. alba contained 0.89 mg/g of alpha-amanitin, 0.48 mg/g of beta-amanitin and 0.001 mg/g gamma-amanitin in contrast to the 2.46, 1.94 and 0.36 mg/g found in the gills and the 2.40, 1.75 and 0.27 mg/g found in the cap. The concentration found in the gills, cap, stipe and volva of Amanita phalloides var. alba is lower than in Amanita phalloides however the spores were shown to contain a higher concentration. In both studies six mushrooms were spore printed, dried and tested with the toxin level in the whole mushroom being derived from testing one half of the whole mushroom cut down the middle, the other half was divided into cap, gill, stipe and volva sections to test individually with the parts ground into a powder and tested as 1gram samples. In 2010, a study on Amanita bisporigera, the destroying angel, determined that the concentrations of toxins in the spores were also lower than the levels found in the cap or stipe.

Toxin concentration in Amanita phalloides (mg/g)
Toxin	Cap	Gills	Stipe	Volva	Spores	Whole dry mushroom	Whole fresh mushroom	Mycelium
Alpha-amanitin	2.95	3.39	2.36	1.03	0.087	2.80	0.33	0.024
Beta-amanitin	2.53	2.95	1.75	0.64	0.048	2.38	0.28	0.01
Gamma-amanitin	0.62	0.66	0.5	0.25	0.18	0.6	0.07	0.24
Phallacidin	2.27	2.06	2.04	1.88	0.055	2.12	0.25	0.42
Phalloidin	1.40	1.38	1.18	1.25	0.018	1.32	0.15	0.01

Toxin concentration in Amanita phalloides var. alba (mg/g)
Toxin	Cap	Gills	Stipe	Volva	Spores	Whole dry mushroom	Whole fresh mushroom
Alpha-amanitin	2.40	2.46	1.52	0.56	0.89	2.14	0.21
Beta-amanitin	1.75	1.94	1.00	0.36	0.48	1.71	0.16
Gamma-amanitin	0.27	0.36	0.21	0.07	0.001	0.31	0.03
Phallacidin	1.64	2.26	2.06	2.08	0.99	2.10	0.20
Phalloidin	0.87	1.30	1.13	1.34	0.12	1.09	0.10

Toxin concentration in Amanita bisporigera (mg/g)
Toxin	Cap	Stipe	Spores
Alpha-amanitin	1.70 ± 0.68	1.70 ± 0.45	0.30 ± 0.04
Phallacidin	2.71 ± 0.65	1.66 ± 0.40	0.02 ± 0.01
Phalloidin	11.98 ± 1.66	11.15 ± 2.43	0.00 ± 0.05

Amatoxins are extremely toxic to humans with Amanita phalloides and its variants making up many of the cases of fatal toxicity after consumption. These toxins have high heat stability and this property combined with their solubility in water make them exceptionally toxic as they are not destroyed by cooking or drying. In addition, amatoxins are resistant to enzyme and acid degradation, and therefore when ingested they are not inactivated in the gastrointestinal tract. A fatal case was reported after consuming A. phalloides that had been frozen for 7–8 months, thus demonstrating that these compounds are also resistant to the freeze/thawing processes. Additionally, amatoxins decompose very slowly when stored in open, aqueous solutions or following prolonged exposure to sun or neon light.

In 2015, a case study was conducted on a patient who cooked and consumed just the caps from two Amanita phalloides mushrooms and was subsequently admitted to hospital a day later. The subject was a 61-year-old man with a body weight of 67 kg (148 lb) who was presenting with fatigue, abdominal pain, nausea, vomiting and diarrhea. Mushrooms were collected from the same region and shown to the patient in order to confirm that these were what he had eaten and two mushrooms of approximately the same size and level of maturity were selected for study. Previous studies have demonstrated that younger mushrooms can contain a higher concentration of toxins than is found in mature specimens. The combined weight of the caps of these two mushrooms was 43.4g fresh or 4.3g when dry and when tested were found to contain a total of 21.3 mg of amatoxin distributed as 11.9 mg alpha-amanitin, 8.4 mg beta-amanitin and 1 mg gamma-amanitin. Analysis of the patient's urine after 4 days of treatment in hospital showed a concentration of 2.7 ng/ml alpha-amanitin and 1.25 ng/ml beta-amanitin with no gamma-amanitin detected. The patient survived and was discharged after 9 days of treatment with follow up tests showing no signs of liver damage but based on this case it was estimated that an oral dose of 0.32 mg amatoxin per kg of body mass could be lethal with an approximate lethal dose of alpha-amanitin being 0.2 mg/kg when taken orally. It was estimated that consuming more than 50 g (1.8 oz) of fresh Amanita phalloides, roughly 2 medium-sized mushrooms could be deadly. Clinical tests showed that the amount consumed by the patient remained below the hypothetical lethal dose, which the study notes probably varies depending on patient health, predisposition to liver damage and regional variation in toxin concentrations.

Anecdotes have been repeated in field guides that claim foragers have fallen ill from spores alone after collecting toxic Amanita species in the same basket, unwittingly leaving their spores to collect on the harvest before the toxic ones were discarded. This subject however has not been researched and studies make no claims one way or the other as to the possibility of poisoning from spores alone. Given that the concentration of toxins found in the spores is lower than that of the cap, it would require the consumption of a substantial mass of spores, in excess of the weight of the mushroom caps themselves, in order to reach a fatal dose.

== Mushroom species ==
Amatoxin-containing mushroom species from the genera Amanita, Galerina and Lepiota.

Amanita species	Galerina species	Lepiota species
Amanita phalloides	Galerina badipes	Lepiota brunneoincarnata
Amanita bisporigera	Galerina beinrothii	Lepiota brunneolilacea
Amanita decipiens	Galerina fasciculata	Lepiota castanea
Amanita hygroscopica	Galerina helvoliceps	Lepiota clypeolaria
Amanita ocreata	Galerina indica	Lepiota clypeolarioides
Amanita suballiacea	Galerina marginata	Lepiota felina
Amanita tenuifolia	Galerina sulciceps	Lepiota fulvella
Amanita verna		Lepiota fuscovinacea
Amanita virosa		Lepiota griseovirens
		Lepiota heimii
		Lepiota helveoloides
		Lepiota kuehneri
		Lepiota langei
		Lepiota lilacea
		Lepiota locanensis
		Lepiota ochraceofulva
		Lepiota pseudohelveola
		Lepiota pseudolilacea
		Lepiota rufescens
		Lepiota subincarnata
		Lepiota xanthophylla

== See also ==
- Phallotoxins, a closely related class of mycotoxins
