= Amaninamide =

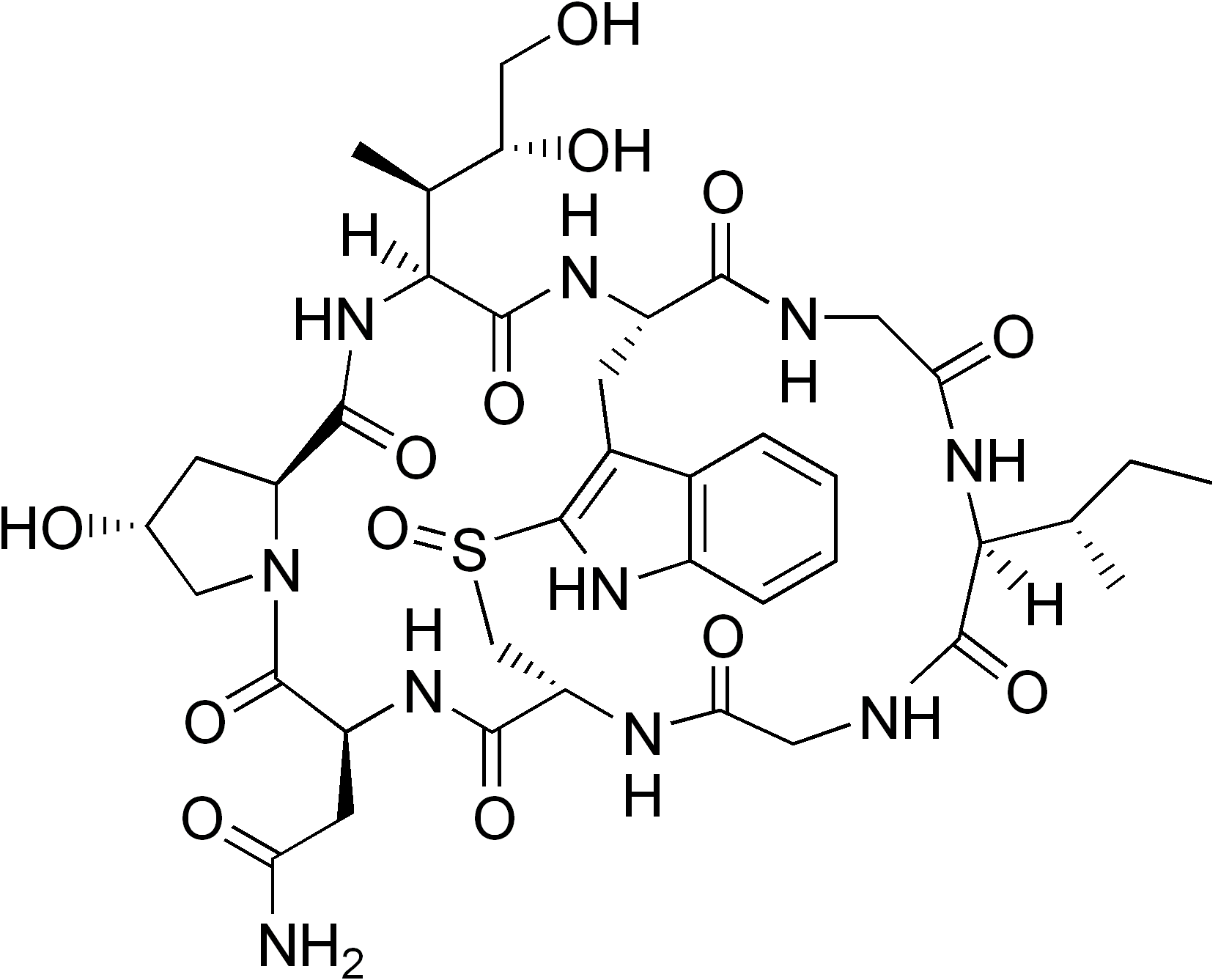

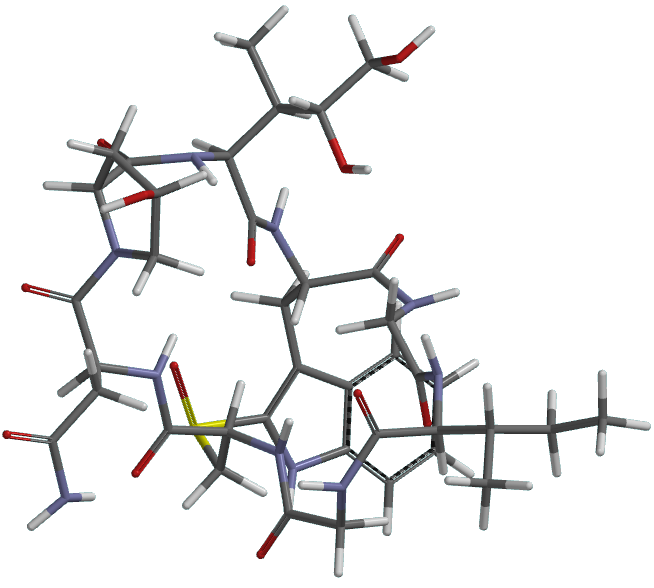

Names
- Other names 4-(2-mercapto-L-tryptophan)-alpha-Amanitin

Identifiers
CAS Number	58311-65-2
3D model (JSmol)	Interactive image
ChemSpider	2299516
PubChem CID	3035225
UNII	A0W351848Z
- InChI: InChI=1S/C39H54N10O13S/c1-4-17(2)31-36(59)42-12-29(54)43-25-16-63(62)38-21(20-7-5-6-8-22(20)46-38)10-23(33(56)41-13-30(55)47-31)44-37(60)32(18(3)27(52)15-50)48-35(58)26-9-19(51)14-49(26)39(61)24(11-28(40)53)45-34(25)57/h5-8,17-19,23-27,31-32,46,50-52H,4,9-16H2,1-3H3,(H2,40,53)(H,41,56)(H,42,59)(H,43,54)(H,44,60)(H,45,57)(H,47,55)(H,48,58) Key: BOHCOUQZNDPURZ-UHFFFAOYSA-N; InChI=1/C39H54N10O13S/c1-4-17(2)31-36(59)42-12-29(54)43-25-16-63(62)38-21(20-7-5-6-8-22(20)46-38)10-23(33(56)41-13-30(55)47-31)44-37(60)32(18(3)27(52)15-50)48-35(58)26-9-19(51)14-49(26)39(61)24(11-28(40)53)45-34(25)57/h5-8,17-19,23-27,31-32,46,50-52H,4,9-16H2,1-3H3,(H2,40,53)(H,41,56)(H,42,59)(H,43,54)(H,44,60)(H,45,57)(H,47,55)(H,48,58) Key: BOHCOUQZNDPURZ-UHFFFAOYAZ
- SMILES: O=C(NCC(N[C@@](C(NCC(N[C@@H](C3)C(N[C@@H](CC(N)=O)C(N5[C@H]4C[C@@H](O)C5)=O)=O)=O)=O)([H])[C@@H](C)CC)=O)[C@H](CC1=C(S3=O)NC2=C1C=CC=C2)NC([C@@]([C@@H](C)[C@@H](O)CO)([H])N[C@@]4=O)=O

Properties
Chemical formula	C_{39}H_{54}N_{10}O_{13}S
Molar mass	902.97 g/mol
Appearance	Colorless, crystalline solid
Solubility in water	Soluble
Solubility in ethanol, methanol	Soluble
- Except where otherwise noted, data are given for materials in their standard state (at 25 °C [77 °F], 100 kPa). verify (what is ?) Infobox references

Amaninamide is a cyclic peptide. It is one of the amatoxins, all of which are found in several members of the mushroom genera Amanita, Lepiota and Galerina. It differs from alpha-amanitin in lacking the hydroxyl group on tryptophan. This alters its UV absorption spectrum but not its toxicity.

== Toxicology ==
Like other amatoxins, amaninamide is an inhibitor of RNA polymerase II. Upon ingestion, it binds to the RNA polymerase II enzyme which completely prevents mRNA synthesis, effectively causing cytolysis of hepatocytes (liver cells) and kidney cells.

== See also ==
- Mushroom poisoning
