= Oligopeptide =

Peptide consisting of two to twenty amino acids

A tripeptide (example Val-Gly-Ala) with green marked amino end (L-Valine) and blue marked carboxyl end (L-Alanine)

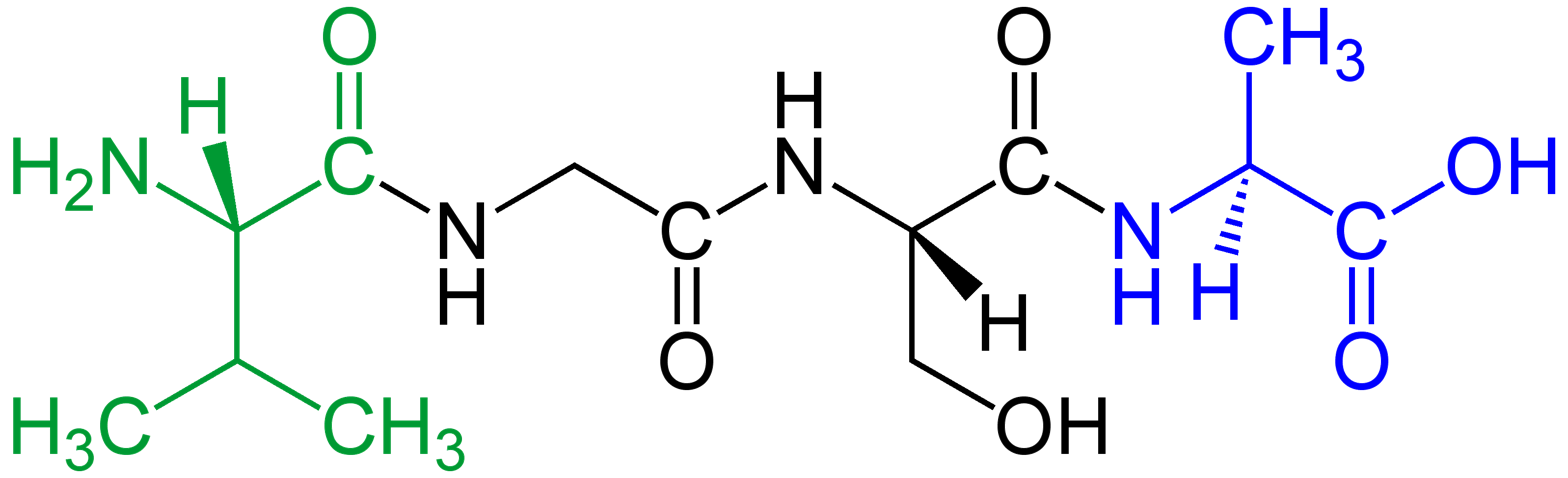
A tetrapeptide (example Val-Gly-Ser-Ala) with green marked amino end (L-valine) and blue marked carboxyl end (L-alanine)

An oligopeptide (oligo-, "a few"), is a peptide consisting of two to twenty amino acids, including dipeptides, tripeptides, tetrapeptides, and other polypeptides. Some of the major classes of naturally occurring oligopeptides include aeruginosins, cyanopeptolins, microcystins, microviridins, microginins, anabaenopeptins, and cyclamides. Microcystins are best studied because of their potential toxicity impact in drinking water. A review of some oligopeptides found that the largest class are the cyanopeptolins (40.1%), followed by microcystins (13.4%).

== Production ==
Oligopeptide classes are produced by nonribosomal peptides synthases (NRPS), except cyclamides and microviridins are synthesized through ribosomic pathways.

== Examples ==
Examples of oligopeptides include:

- Amanitins – Cyclic peptides taken from carpophores of several different mushroom species. They are potent inhibitors of RNA polymerases in most eukaryotic species, the prevent the production of mRNA and protein synthesis. These peptides are important in the study of transcription. Alpha-amanitin is the main toxin from the species Amanita phalloides, poisonous if ingested by humans or animals.
- Antipain – An oligopeptide produced by various bacteria which acts as a protease inhibitor.
- Ceruletide – A specific decapeptide found in the skin of Hyla caerulea, the Australian green tree frog. Ceruletide has very much in common with regard to action and composition to cholecystokinin. It stimulates gastric, biliary, and pancreatic secretion; and certain smooth muscle. It is used to induce pancreatitis in experimental animal models.
- Glutathione – A tripeptide with many roles in cells. It conjugates to drugs to make them more soluble for excretion, is a cofactor for some enzymes, is involved in protein disulfide bond rearrangement and reduces peroxides.
- Leupeptins – A group of acylated oligopeptides produced by Actinomycetes that function as protease inhibitors. They have been known to inhibit to varying degrees trypsin, plasmin, kallikreins, papain and the cathepsins.
- Netropsin – A basic oligopeptide isolated from Streptomyces netropsis. It is cytotoxic and its strong, specific binding to A-T areas of DNA is useful to genetics research.
- Pepstatins – N-acylated oligopeptides isolated from culture filtrates of Actinomycetes, which act specifically to inhibit acid proteases such as pepsin and renin.
- Peptide T – N-(N-(N(2)-(N-(N-(N-(N-D-Alanyl L-seryl)-L-threonyl)-L-threonyl) L-threonyl)-L-asparaginyl)-L-tyrosyl) L-threonine. Octapeptide sharing sequence homology with HIV envelope protein gp120. It may be useful as antiviral agent in AIDS therapy. The core pentapeptide sequence, TTNYT, consisting of amino acids 4-8 in peptide T, is the HIV envelope sequence required for attachment to the CD4 receptor.
- Phalloidin – A very toxic polypeptide isolated mainly from Amanita phalloides (Agaricaceae) or death cap; causes fatal liver, kidney and CNS damage in mushroom poisoning; used in the study of liver damage.
- Teprotide – A human-made nonapeptide (Pyr-Trp-Pro-Arg-Pro-Gln-Ile-Pro-Pro) which is exactly the same as the peptide from the venom of the snake, Bothrops jararaca. It inhibits kininase II and angiotensin I and has been proposed as an antihypertensive agent.
- Tuftsin – N(2)-((1-(N(2)-L-Threonyl)-L-lysyl)-L-prolyl)-L-arginine. A tetrapeptide manufactured in the spleen by enzymatic cleavage of a leukophilic gamma-globulin. It stimulates the phagocytic activity of blood polymorphonuclear leukocytes and neutrophils in particular. The peptide is located in the Fd fragment of the gamma-globulin molecule.
- Halovir

== See also ==
- Micropeptide
- Oligoester
- Oligomer
- Oligopeptidase
- Peptide synthesis
- Protease
