= Amanin =

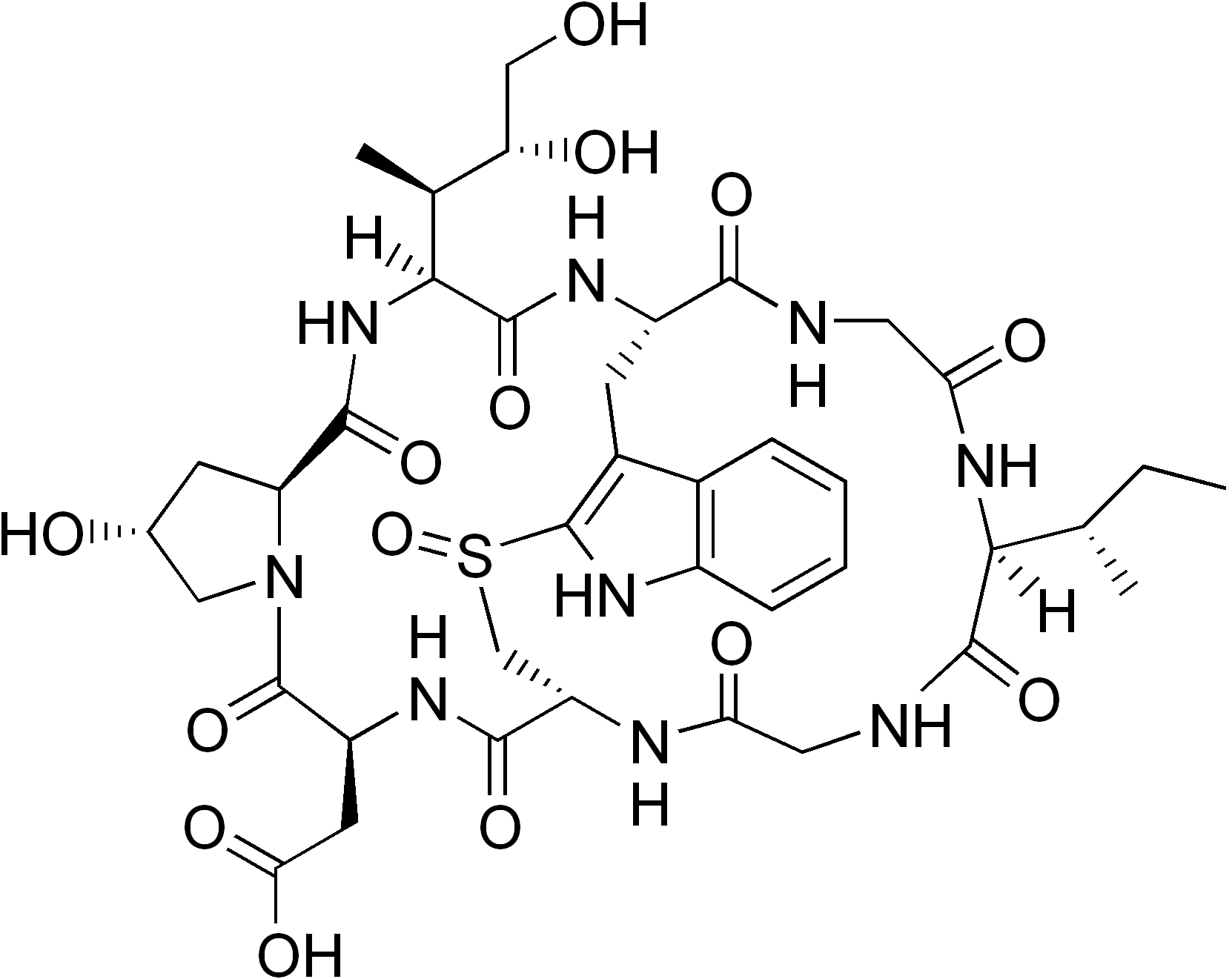

Identifiers
CAS Number	21150-21-0
3D model (JSmol)	Interactive image
ChemSpider	28316
PubChem CID	30508
UNII	VIW95I76GY
CompTox Dashboard (EPA)	DTXSID70895849
- InChI: InChI=1S/C39H53N9O14S/c1-5-16(2)31-36(59)41-12-28(52)42-26-15-63(62)38-22(21-7-6-19(50)8-23(21)45-38)10-24(33(56)40-13-29(53)46-31)43-37(60)32(17(3)18(4)49)47-35(58)27-9-20(51)14-48(27)39(61)25(11-30(54)55)44-34(26)57/h6-8,16-18,20,24-27,31-32,45,49-51H,5,9-15H2,1-4H3,(H,40,56)(H,41,59)(H,42,52)(H,43,60)(H,44,57)(H,46,53)(H,47,58)(H,54,55) Key: OFILNAORONITPV-UHFFFAOYSA-N; InChI=1/C39H53N9O14S/c1-5-16(2)31-36(59)41-12-28(52)42-26-15-63(62)38-22(21-7-6-19(50)8-23(21)45-38)10-24(33(56)40-13-29(53)46-31)43-37(60)32(17(3)18(4)49)47-35(58)27-9-20(51)14-48(27)39(61)25(11-30(54)55)44-34(26)57/h6-8,16-18,20,24-27,31-32,45,49-51H,5,9-15H2,1-4H3,(H,40,56)(H,41,59)(H,42,52)(H,43,60)(H,44,57)(H,46,53)(H,47,58)(H,54,55) Key: OFILNAORONITPV-UHFFFAOYAZ
- SMILES: CC[C@H](C)[C@H]1C(=O)NCC(=O)N[C@H]2CS(=O)C3=C(C[C@@H](C(=O)NCC(=O)N1)NC(=O)[C@@H](NC(=O)[C@@H]4C[C@H](CN4C(=O)[C@@H](NC2=O)CC(=O)O)O)[C@@H](C)[C@H](CO)O)C5=CC=CC=C5N3

Properties
Chemical formula	C_{39}H_{53}N_{9}O_{14}S
Molar mass	903.96 g·mol^{−1}
- Except where otherwise noted, data are given for materials in their standard state (at 25 °C [77 °F], 100 kPa). verify (what is ?) Infobox references

Amanin is a cyclic peptide. It is one of the amatoxins, all of which are found in several members of the mushroom genus Amanita.

== Toxicology ==
Like other amatoxins, amanin is an inhibitor of RNA polymerase II. Upon ingestion, it binds to the RNA polymerase II enzyme which completely prevents mRNA synthesis, effectively causing cytolysis of hepatocytes (liver cells) and kidney cells.

== See also ==
- Mushroom poisoning
