= Antipain =

Names
- IUPAC name N^{2}-{[(1S)-1-carboxy-2-phenylethyl]carbamoyl}-N^{5}-(diaminomethylidene)-L-ornithyl-N-{(2S)-5-[(diaminomethylidene)amino]-1-oxopentan-2-yl}-L-valinamide

Identifiers
CAS Number	37691-11-5
3D model (JSmol)	Interactive image
ChemSpider	34678
PubChem CID	37817
UNII	47V479BE6L
- InChI: InChI=1S/C27H44N10O6/c1-16(2)21(23(40)34-18(15-38)10-6-12-32-25(28)29)37-22(39)19(11-7-13-33-26(30)31)35-27(43)36-20(24(41)42)14-17-8-4-3-5-9-17/h3-5,8-9,15-16,18-21H,6-7,10-14H2,1-2H3,(H,34,40)(H,37,39)(H,41,42)(H4,28,29,32)(H4,30,31,33)(H2,35,36,43)/t18-,19-,20-,21-/m0/s1 Key: SDNYTAYICBFYFH-TUFLPTIASA-N; InChI=1/C27H44N10O6/c1-16(2)21(23(40)34-18(15-38)10-6-12-32-25(28)29)37-22(39)19(11-7-13-33-26(30)31)35-27(43)36-20(24(41)42)14-17-8-4-3-5-9-17/h3-5,8-9,15-16,18-21H,6-7,10-14H2,1-2H3,(H,34,40)(H,37,39)(H,41,42)(H4,28,29,32)(H4,30,31,33)(H2,35,36,43)/t18-,19-,20-,21-/m0/s1 Key: SDNYTAYICBFYFH-TUFLPTIABE
- SMILES: O=C[C@@H](NC(=O)[C@@H](NC(=O)[C@@H](NC(=O)N[C@H](C(=O)O)Cc1ccccc1)CCC/N=C(\N)N)C(C)C)CCC/N=C(\N)N

Properties
Chemical formula	C_{27}H_{44}N_{10}O_{6}
Molar mass	604.713 g·mol^{−1}
- Except where otherwise noted, data are given for materials in their standard state (at 25 °C [77 °F], 100 kPa). verify (what is ?) Infobox references

Antipain is an oligopeptide that is isolated from actinomycetes and used in biochemical research as a protease inhibitor of trypsin and papain. It was discovered in 1972 and was the first natural peptide found that contained an ureylene group. Antipain can aid in prevention of coagulation in blood. It is an inhibitor of serine and cysteine proteases.

It has been crystallized in complexes with carboxypeptidase, which is obtained from wheat, and Leishmania major oligopeptidase B. In both cases, the backbone carbonyl of the terminal arginine of antipain forms a covalent bond to the active site serine in the protease.

A study was performed for information on the effect of antipain on the quality of post-thawed ram semen. The results from this experiment concluded that antipain aided in the quality of ram semen by maintaining the sperm mobility. Antipain includes the function to inhibit a degrading enzyme, called plasmin, permitting this substance to be able to improve the resistance of membrane disruption by freezing temperatures.

Antipain Y, a similar chemical compound that is an analog of antipain, which was isolated from a species of Streptomyces, inhibits the release of neurotransmitters in rat dorsal root ganglion neurons.
