= Ε-Amanitin =

Cyclic peptide part of a group of toxins present in Amanita mushrooms

ε-Amanitin
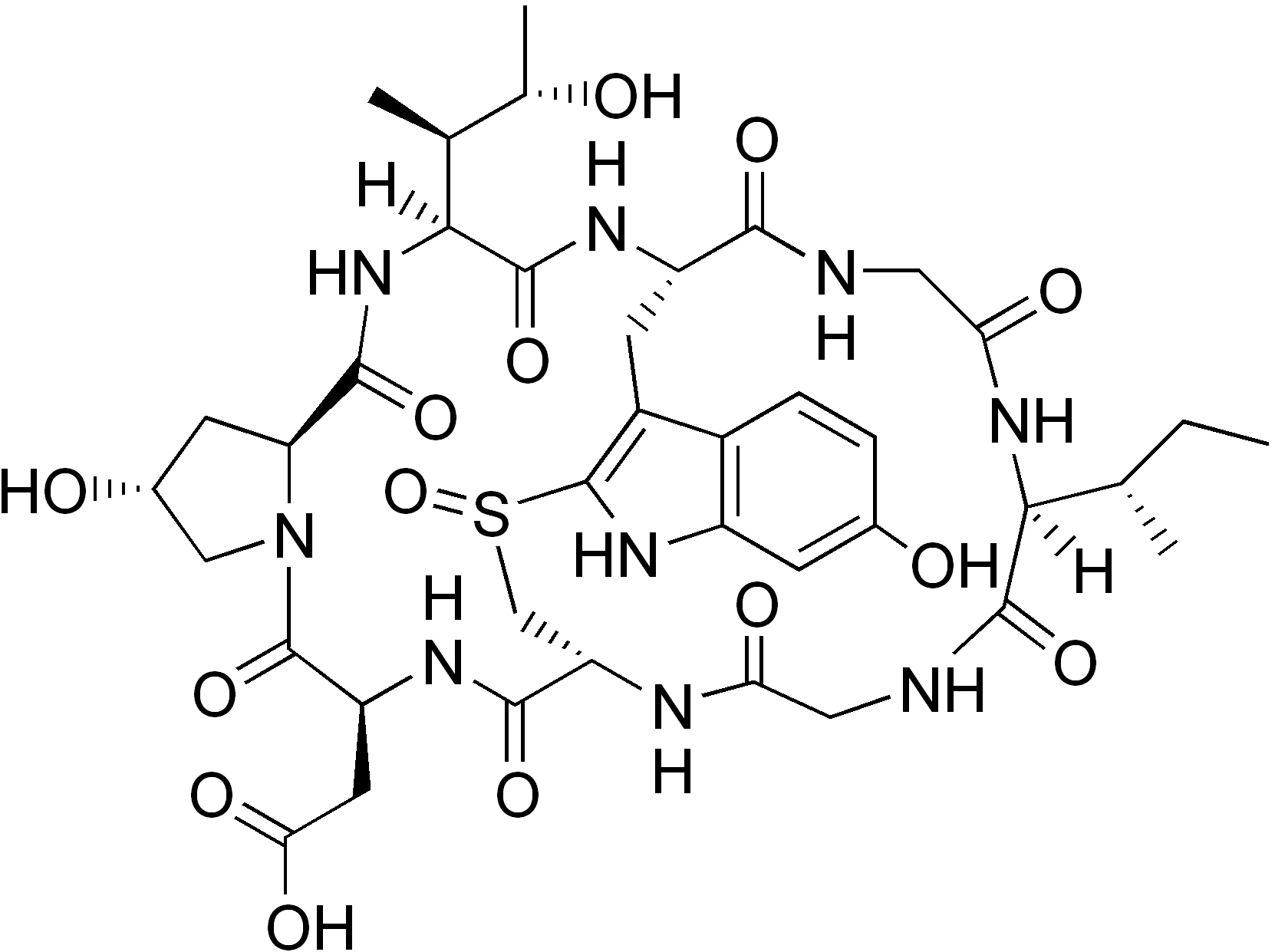

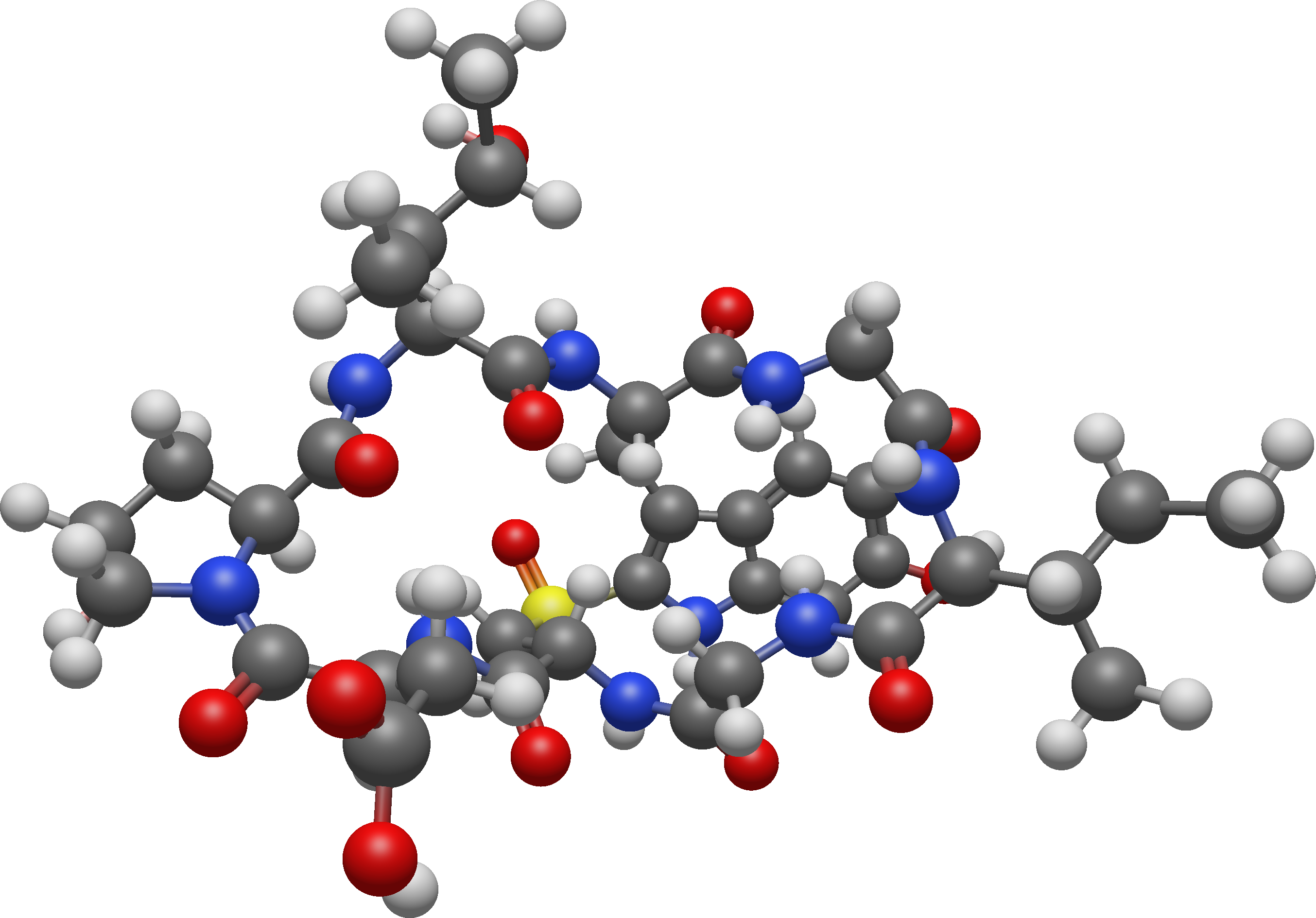

Identifiers
CAS Number	21705-02-2
3D model (JSmol)	Interactive image
ChemSpider	26234941
PubChem CID	30508
CompTox Dashboard (EPA)	DTXSID201028142
- InChI: InChI=1S/C39H53N9O14S/c1-5-16(2)31-36(59)41-12-28(52)42-26-15-63(62)38-22(21-7-6-19(50)8-23(21)45-38)10-24(33(56)40-13-29(53)46-31)43-37(60)32(17(3)18(4)49)47-35(58)27-9-20(51)14-48(27)39(61)25(11-30(54)55)44-34(26)57/h6-8,16-18,20,24-27,31-32,45,49-51H,5,9-15H2,1-4H3,(H,40,56)(H,41,59)(H,42,52)(H,43,60)(H,44,57)(H,46,53)(H,47,58)(H,54,55)/t16-,17-,18-,20+,24-,25-,26-,27-,31-,32-,63?/m0/s1 Key: OFILNAORONITPV-ZUROAWGWSA-N; InChI=1/C39H53N9O14S/c1-5-16(2)31-36(59)41-12-28(52)42-26-15-63(62)38-22(21-7-6-19(50)8-23(21)45-38)10-24(33(56)40-13-29(53)46-31)43-37(60)32(17(3)18(4)49)47-35(58)27-9-20(51)14-48(27)39(61)25(11-30(54)55)44-34(26)57/h6-8,16-18,20,24-27,31-32,45,49-51H,5,9-15H2,1-4H3,(H,40,56)(H,41,59)(H,42,52)(H,43,60)(H,44,57)(H,46,53)(H,47,58)(H,54,55)/t16-,17-,18-,20+,24-,25-,26-,27-,31-,32-,63?/m0/s1 Key: OFILNAORONITPV-ZUROAWGWBI
- SMILES: O=C(NCC(N[C@@](C(NCC(N[C@@H](C3)C(N[C@@H](CC(O)=O)C(N5[C@H]4C[C@@H](O)C5)=O)=O)=O)=O)([H])[C@@H](C)CC)=O)[C@H](CC1=C(S3=O)NC2=C1C=CC(O)=C2)NC([C@@]([C@@H](C)[C@@H](O)C)([H])N[C@@]4=O)=O

Properties
Chemical formula	C_{39}H_{53}N_{9}O_{14}S
Molar mass	903.96 g/mol
Appearance	Colorless, crystalline solid
Solubility in water	Soluble
Solubility in ethanol and methanol	Soluble
- Except where otherwise noted, data are given for materials in their standard state (at 25 °C [77 °F], 100 kPa). verify (what is ?) Infobox references

ε-Amanitin (epsilon-Amanitin) is a cyclic peptide. It is an amatoxin, all of which are found in several members of the mushroom genus Amanita. The oral LD_{50} of ε-amanitin is approximately 0.1 mg/kg.

== Toxicology ==
Like other amatoxins, ε-amanitin is an inhibitor of RNA polymerase II. Upon ingestion, it binds to the RNA polymerase II enzyme which completely prevents mRNA synthesis, effectively causing cytolysis of hepatocytes (liver cells) and kidney cells.

== See also ==
- Mushroom poisoning
