= Γ-Amanitin =

Cyclic peptide part of a group of toxins present in Amanita mushrooms

γ-Amanitin
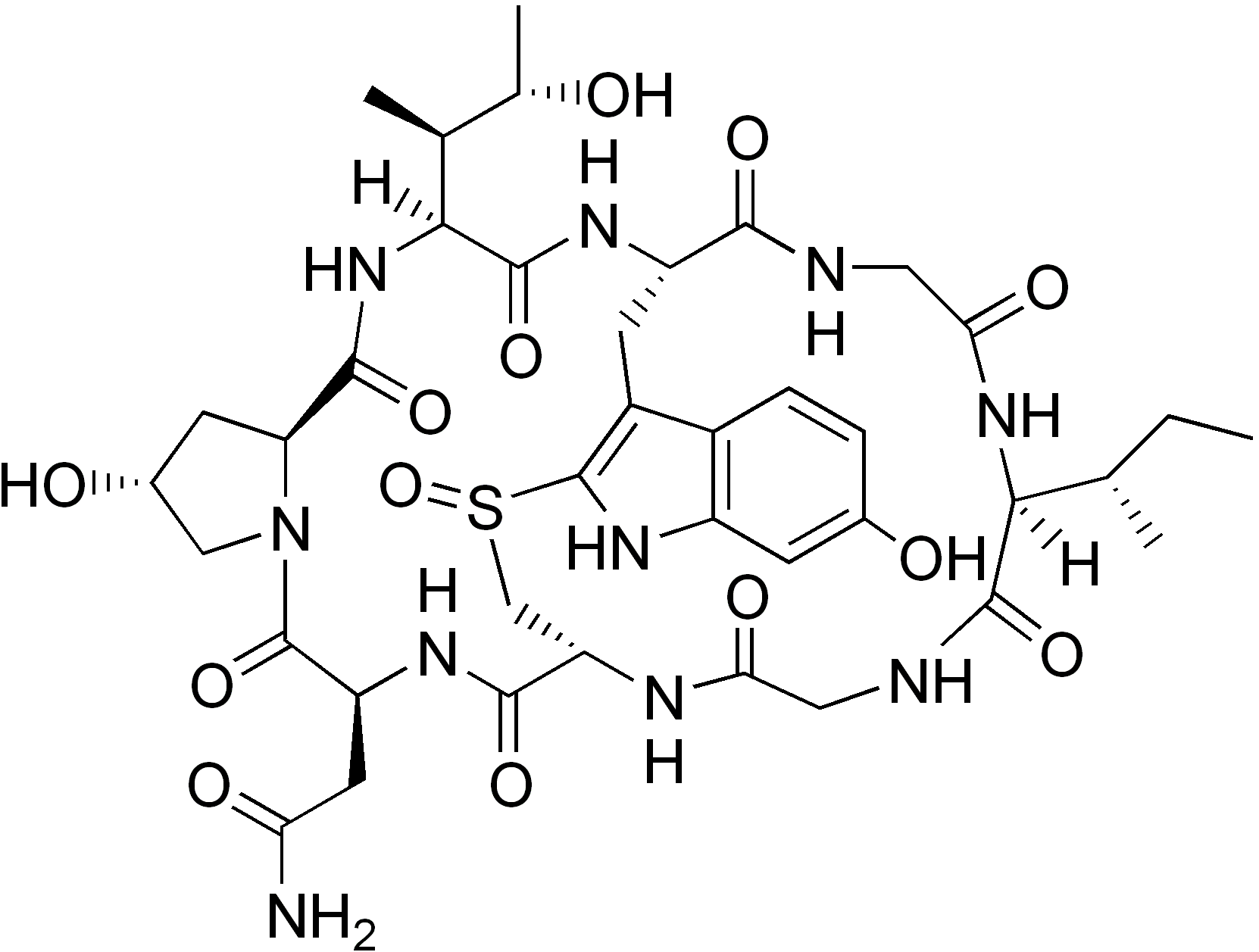

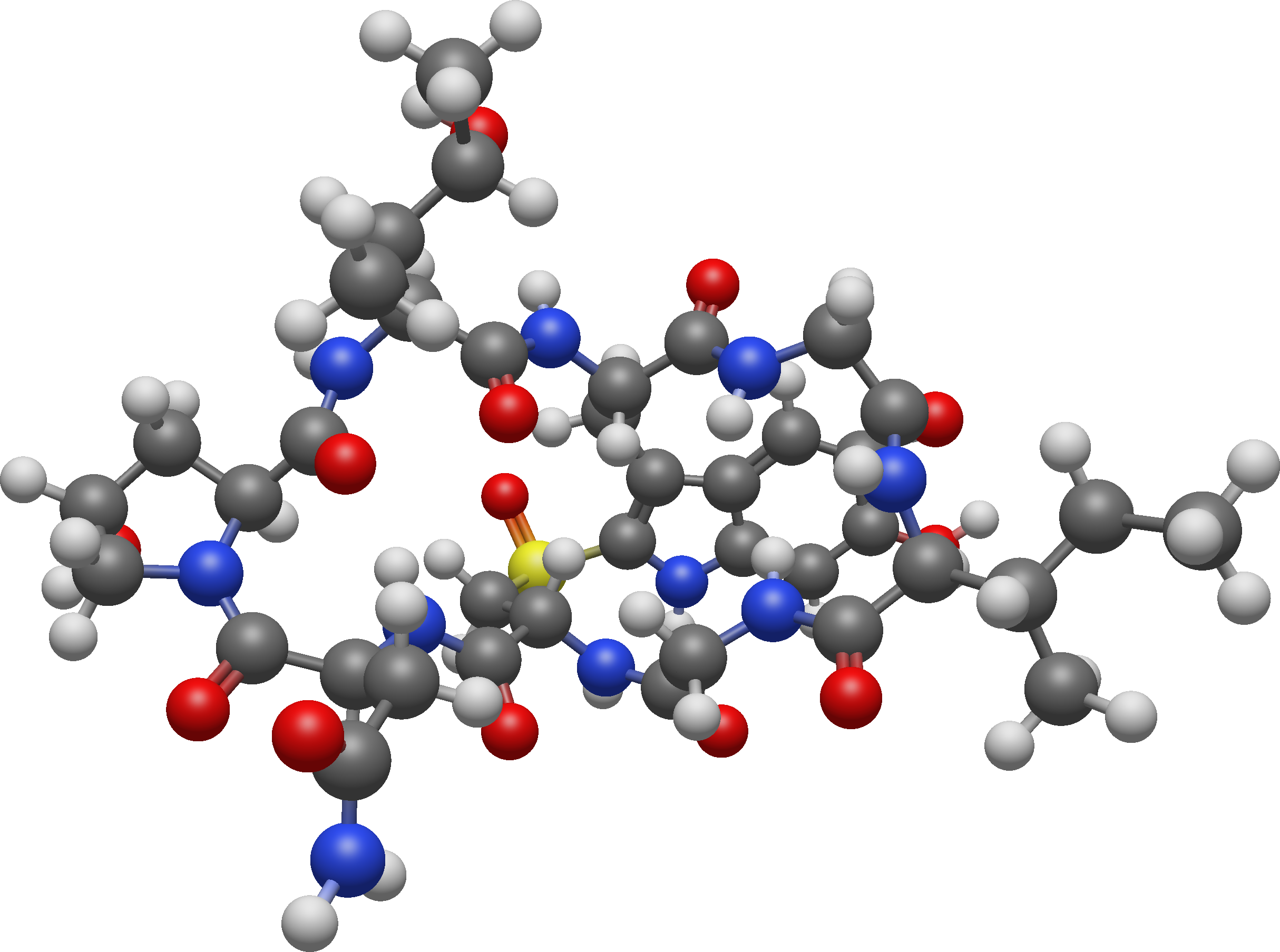

Identifiers
CAS Number	21150-23-2
3D model (JSmol)	Interactive image
ChemSpider	26234940
PubChem CID	26116
UNII	ZOZ8ILM7WM
CompTox Dashboard (EPA)	DTXSID10897721
- InChI: InChI=1S/C39H54N10O13S/c1-5-16(2)31-36(59)42-12-29(54)43-26-15-63(62)38-22(21-7-6-19(51)8-23(21)46-38)10-24(33(56)41-13-30(55)47-31)44-37(60)32(17(3)18(4)50)48-35(58)27-9-20(52)14-49(27)39(61)25(11-28(40)53)45-34(26)57/h6-8,16-18,20,24-27,31-32,46,50-52H,5,9-15H2,1-4H3,(H2,40,53)(H,41,56)(H,42,59)(H,43,54)(H,44,60)(H,45,57)(H,47,55)(H,48,58)/t16-,17-,18-,20+,24-,25-,26-,27-,31-,32-,63?/m0/s1 Key: WVHGJJRMKGDTEC-ZUROAWGWSA-N; InChI=1/C39H54N10O13S/c1-5-16(2)31-36(59)42-12-29(54)43-26-15-63(62)38-22(21-7-6-19(51)8-23(21)46-38)10-24(33(56)41-13-30(55)47-31)44-37(60)32(17(3)18(4)50)48-35(58)27-9-20(52)14-49(27)39(61)25(11-28(40)53)45-34(26)57/h6-8,16-18,20,24-27,31-32,46,50-52H,5,9-15H2,1-4H3,(H2,40,53)(H,41,56)(H,42,59)(H,43,54)(H,44,60)(H,45,57)(H,47,55)(H,48,58)/t16-,17-,18-,20+,24-,25-,26-,27-,31-,32-,63?/m0/s1 Key: WVHGJJRMKGDTEC-ZUROAWGWBF
- SMILES: CC[C@H](C)[C@H]1C(=O)NCC(=O)N[C@H]2CS(=O)c3c(c4ccc(cc4[nH]3)O)C[C@@H](C(=O)NCC(=O)N1)NC(=O)[C@@H](NC(=O)[C@@H]5C[C@H](CN5C(=O)[C@@H](NC2=O)CC(=O)N)O)[C@@H](C)[C@H](C)O

Properties
Chemical formula	C_{39}H_{54}N_{10}O_{13}S
Molar mass	902.97 g/mol
- Except where otherwise noted, data are given for materials in their standard state (at 25 °C [77 °F], 100 kPa). verify (what is ?) Infobox references

γ-Amanitin (gamma-Amanitin) is a cyclic peptide of eight amino acids. It is an amatoxin, a group of toxins isolated from and found in several members of the mushroom genus Amanita, one being the death cap (Amanita phalloides) as well as the destroying angel, a complex of similar species, principally A. virosa and A. bisporigera. The compound is highly toxic, inhibits RNA polymerase II, disrupts synthesis of mRNA, and can be fatal.

== Toxicity ==
Amatoxins selectively inhibit Eukaryotic RNA polymerase II by tightly to the enzyme and severely inhibits translocation along the DNA template; thus the synthesis of mRNA and proteins stops. Amatoxin consumption is characterized by a long asymptomatic period of a few hours (up to a day or more) followed by quick physiological decline due to acute hepatic and tubular necrosis. γ-Amanitin has been found to have similar levels of toxicity to other amatoxins such as α-Amanitin.

== See also ==
- Mushroom poisoning
