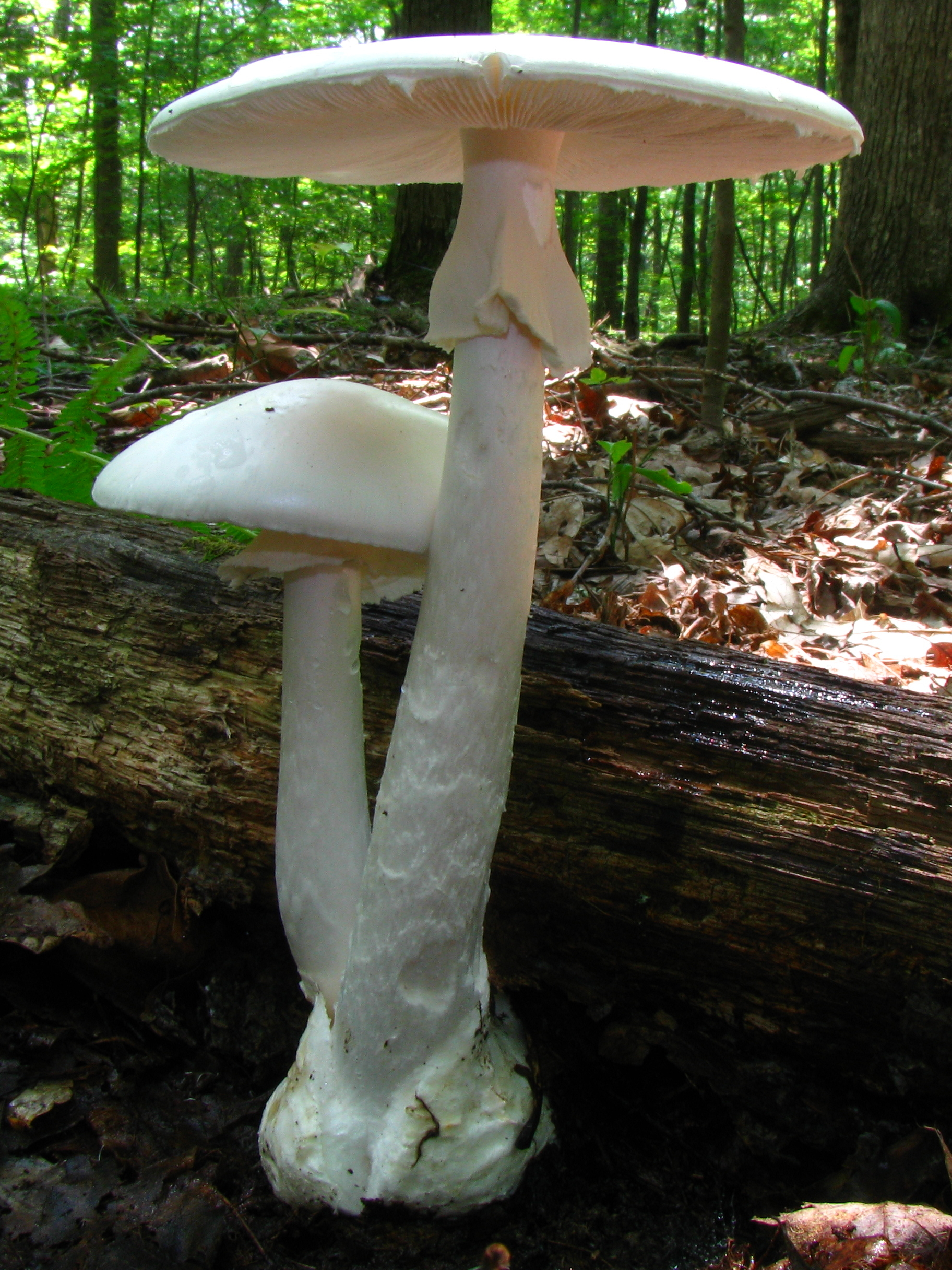

Conservation status
- Least Concern (IUCN 3.1)

Scientific classification
- Kingdom: Fungi
- Division: Basidiomycota
- Class: Agaricomycetes
- Order: Agaricales
- Family: Amanitaceae
- Genus: Amanita
- Species: A. bisporigera

Binomial name
- Amanita bisporigera G.F.Atk. (1906)

Synonyms
- Amanita phalloides var. striatula Peck (1902); Amanita vernella (Murrill) Murrill (1945); Amanitina bisporigera (G.F.Atk.) E.-J. Gilbert (1941)

= Amanita bisporigera =

Poisonous species of fungus

Amanita bisporigera
- Mycological characteristics
- Gills on hymenium
- Cap is convex or flat
- Hymenium is free
- Stipe has a ring and volva
- Spore print is white
- Ecology is mycorrhizal
- Edibility is deadly

Amanita bisporigera is a deadly poisonous species of fungus in the family Amanitaceae. It is commonly known as the eastern destroying angel amanita, the eastern North American destroying angel or just as the destroying angel, although the fungus shares this latter name with three other lethal white Amanita species, A. ocreata, A. verna and A. virosa. First described as a new species in 1906, A. bisporigera is classified in the section Phalloideae of its genus together with other amatoxin-containing species.

The mushroom has a smooth white cap that can reach up to 10 centimetres (4 inches) across and a stipe up to 14 cm (5 1/2 in) tall with a white skirt-like ring near the top. The bulbous stipe base is covered with a membranous sac-like volva. The white gills are free from attachment to the stalk and crowded closely together. As the species name suggests, A. bisporigera typically bears two spores on the basidia, although this characteristic is not immutable. A. bisporigera closely resembles a few other white amanitas, including the equally deadly A. virosa and A. verna.

The species is found in mixed coniferous and deciduous forests of eastern North America south to Mexico, but are rare in western North America. The first symptoms of poisoning appear 6 to 24 hours after consumption, followed by a period of apparent improvement, then by symptoms of liver and kidney failure, and death after four days or more.

== Taxonomy ==
- - - - - - - A. exitialis
            - A. subjunquillea var. alba
          - A. virosa
        - A. bisporigera
      - A. fuliginea
    - A. hemibapha

Relationships of Amanita bisporigera and related species based on ITS sequence data. The A. virosa specimen was collected from Japan, A. bisporigera from the US, and the other species from China.

Amanita bisporigera was first described scientifically in 1906 by American botanist George Francis Atkinson in a publication by Cornell University colleague Charles E. Lewis. The type locality was Ithaca, New York, where several collections were made. In his 1941 monograph of world Amanita species, Édouard-Jean Gilbert transferred the species to his new genus Amanitina, but this genus is now considered synonymous with Amanita. In 1944, William Murrill described the species Amanita vernella, collected from Gainesville, Florida; that species is now thought to be synonymous with A. bisporigera after a 1979 examination of its type material revealed basidia that were mostly 2-spored. Amanita phalloides var. striatula, a poorly known taxon originally described from the United States in 1902 by Charles Horton Peck, is considered by Amanita authority Rodham Tulloss to be synonymous with A. bisporigera. Vernacular names for the mushroom include "destroying angel", "deadly amanita", "white death cap", "angel of death" and "eastern North American destroying angel".

Amanita bisporigera belongs to section Phalloideae of the genus Amanita, which contains some of the deadliest Amanita species, including A. phalloides and A. virosa. This classification has been upheld with phylogenetic analyses, which demonstrate that the toxin-producing members of section Phalloideae form a clade—that is, they derive from a common ancestor. In 2005, Zhang and colleagues performed a phylogenetic analysis based on the internal transcribed spacer (ITS) sequences of several white-bodied toxic Amanita species, most of which are found in Asia. Their results support a clade containing A. bisporigera, A. subjunquillea var. alba, A. exitialis, and A. virosa. The Guangzhou destroying angel (Amanita exitialis) has two-spored basidia, like A. bisporigera.

== Description ==
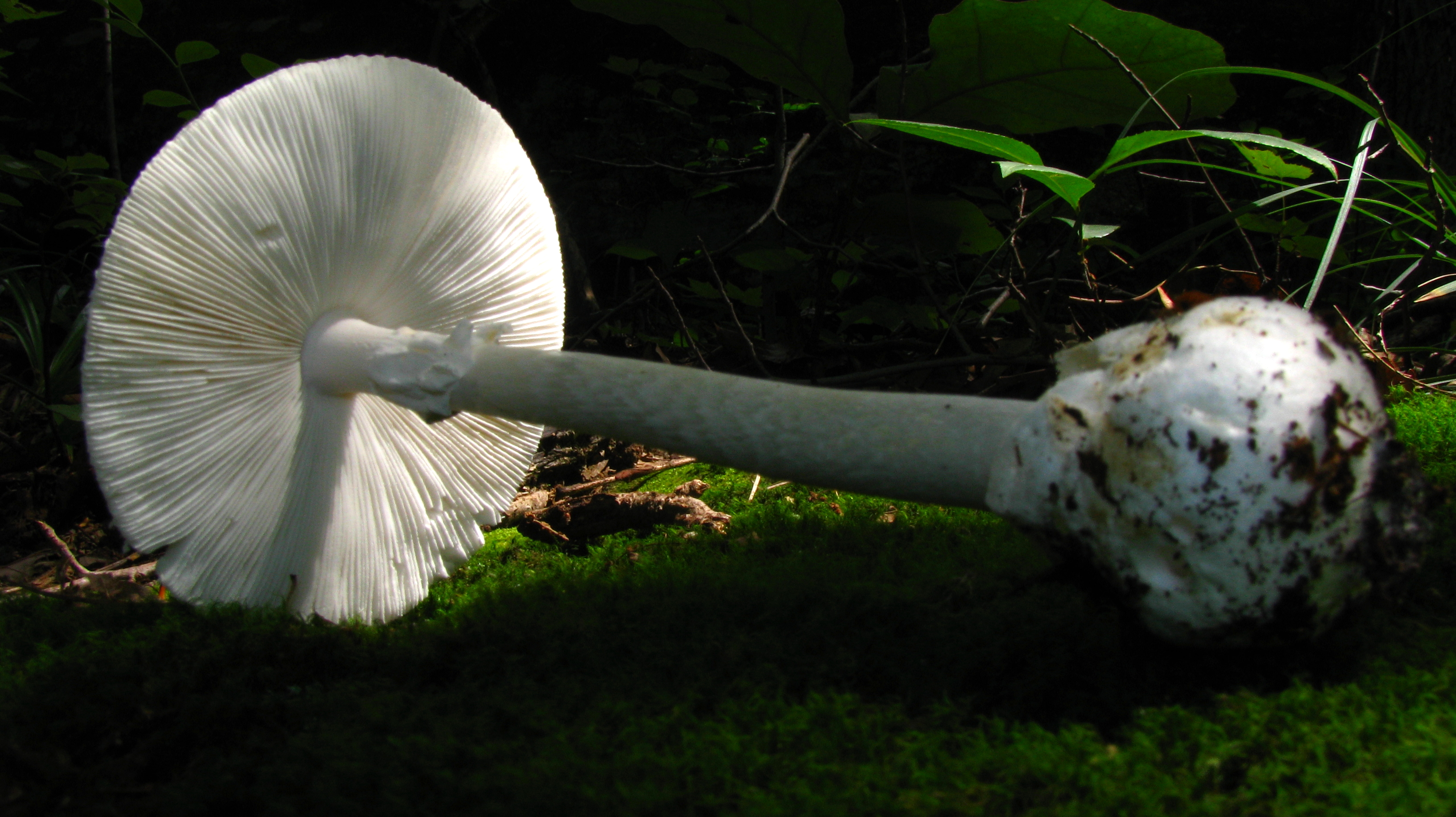
The white gills are crowded closely together, and the stipe base is bulbous.

The cap is 3–13 centimetres (1–5 inches) wide and, depending on its age, ranges in shape from egg-shaped to convex to somewhat flattened. The cap surface is smooth and white, sometimes with a pale tan- or cream-colored tint in the center. The surface is either dry or, when the environment is moist, slightly sticky. The flesh is thin and white, and does not change color when bruised. The margin of the cap, which is rolled inwards in young specimens, does not have striations (grooves), and lacks volval remnants. The gills, also white, are crowded closely together. They are either free from attachment to the stipe or just barely reach it. The lamellulae (short gills that do not extend all the way to the stipe) are numerous, and gradually narrow.

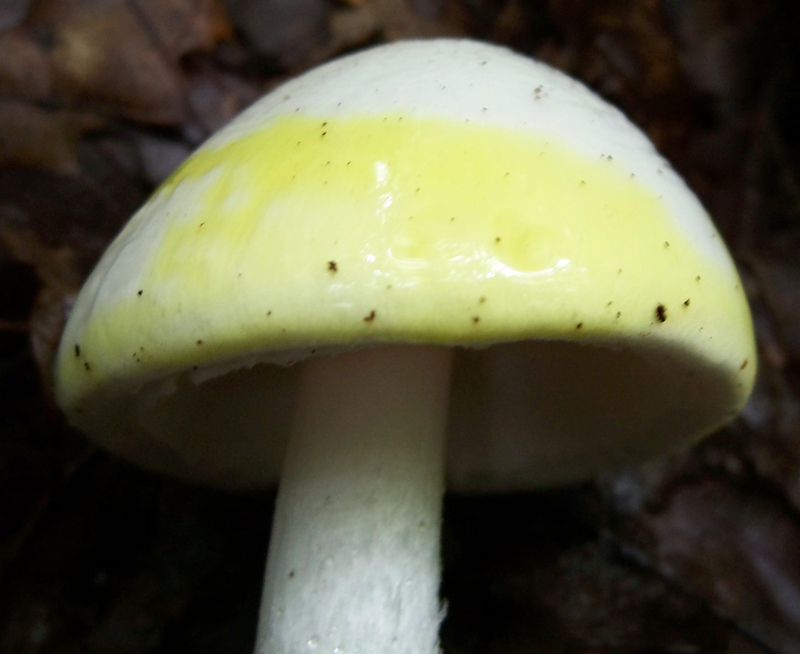
Surfaces turn yellow when stained with potassium hydroxide solution.

The white stipe is 6–14 cm (2 1/2–5 1/2 in) by 0.7–1.8 cm (1/4–3/4 in) thick, solid (i.e., not hollow), and tapers slightly upward. The surface, in young specimens especially, is frequently floccose (covered with tufts of soft hair), fibrillose (covered with small slender fibers), or squamulose (covered with small scales); there may be fine grooves along its length. The bulb at the base of the stipe is spherical or nearly so. The delicate ring on the upper part of the stipe is a remnant of the partial veil that extends from the cap margin to the stalk and covers the gills during development. It is white, thin, membranous, and hangs like a skirt. When young, the mushrooms are enveloped in a membrane called the universal veil, which stretches from the top of the cap to the bottom of the stipe, imparting an oval, egg-like appearance. In mature fruit bodies, the veil's remnants form a membrane around the base, the volva, like an eggshell-shaped cup. On occasion, however, the volva remains underground or gets torn up during development. It is white, sometimes lobed, and may become pressed closely to the stipe. The volva is up to 3.8 cm (1 1/2 in) in height (measured from the base of the bulb), and is about 2 mm thick midway between the top and the base attachment. The mushroom's odor has been described as "pleasant to somewhat nauseous", becoming more cloying as the fruit body ages. The cap flesh turns yellow when a solution of potassium hydroxide (KOH, 5–10%) is applied (a common chemical test used in mushroom identification). This characteristic chemical reaction is shared with A. ocreata and A. virosa, although some authors have expressed doubt about the identity of North American A. virosa, suggesting those collections may represent four-spored A. bisporigera. Tulloss suggests that reports of A. bisporigera that do not turn yellow with KOH were actually based on white forms of A. phalloides. Findings from the Chiricahua Mountains of Arizona and in central Mexico, although "nearly identical" to A. bisporigera, do not stain yellow with KOH; their taxonomic status has not been investigated in detail.

=== Microscopic features ===
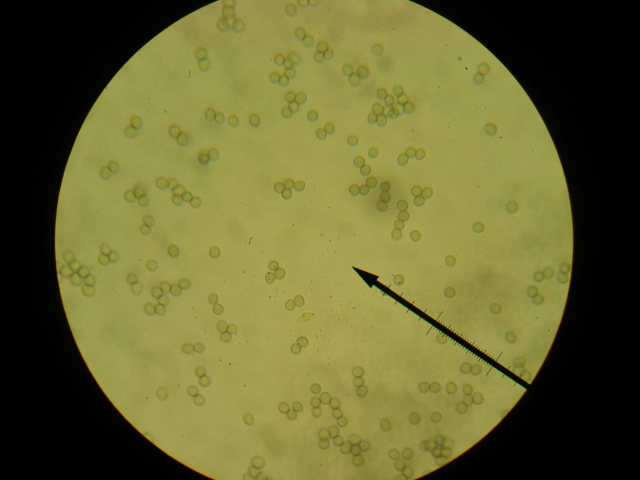
Spores are roughly spherical and translucent

The spore print of A. bisporigera, like most Amanita, is white. The spores are roughly spherical, thin-walled, hyaline (translucent), amyloid, and measure 7.8–9.6 by 7.0–9.0 μm. The cap cuticle is made of partially gelatinized, filamentous interwoven hyphae, 2–6 μm in diameter. The tissue of the gill is bilateral, meaning it diverges from the center of the gill to its outer edge. The subhymenium is ramose—composed of relatively thin branching, unclamped hyphae. The spore-bearing cells, the basidia, are club-shaped, thin-walled, without clamps, with dimensions of 34–45 by 4–11 μm. They are typically two-spored, although rarely three- or four-spored forms have been found. Although the two-spored basidia are a defining characteristic of the species, there is evidence of a tendency to shift towards producing four-spored basidia as the fruiting season progresses. The volva is composed almost exclusively of densely interwoven filamentous hyphae, 2–10 μm in diameter, that are sparsely to moderately branched. There are few small inflated cells, which are mostly spherical to broadly elliptic. The tissue of the stipe is made of abundant, sparsely branched, filamentous hyphae, without clamps, measuring 2–5 μm in diameter. The inflated cells are club-shaped, longitudinally oriented, and up to 2–3 by 15.7 μm. The annulus is made of abundant moderately branched filamentous hyphae, measuring 2–6 μm in diameter. The inflated cells are sparse, broadly elliptic to pear-shaped, and are rarely larger than 31 by 22 μm. Pleurocystidia and cheilocystidia (cystidia found on the gill faces and edges, respectively) are absent, but there may be cylindrical to sac-like cells of the partial veil on the gill edges; these cells are hyaline and measure 24–34 by 7–16 μm.

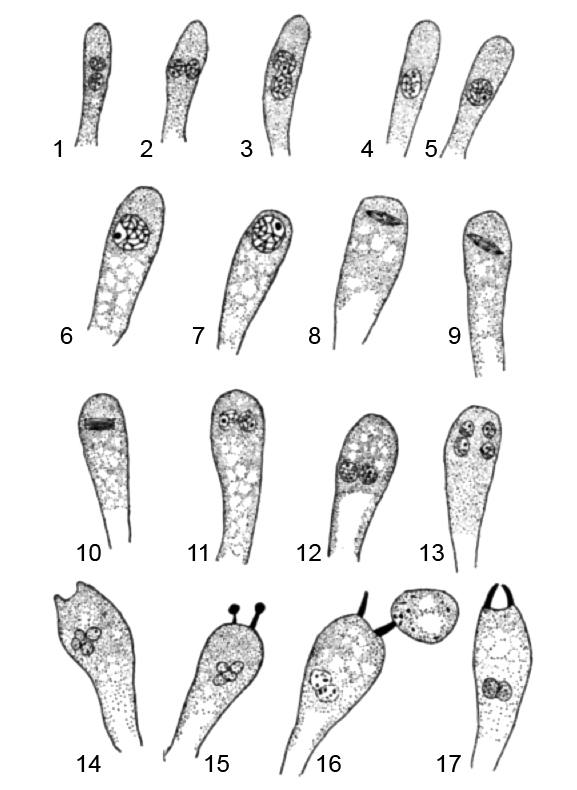
Development of basidia, as illustrated by Lewis in 1906

In 1906 Charles E. Lewis studied and illustrated the development of the basidia in order to compare the nuclear behavior of the two-spored with that of the four-spored forms. Initially (1), the young basidium, appearing as a club-shaped branch from the subhymenium, is filled with cytoplasm and contains two primary nuclei, which have distinct nucleoli. As the basidium grows larger, the membranes of the two nuclei contact (2), and then the membrane disappears at the point of contact (3). The two primary nuclei remain distinct for a short time, but eventually the two nuclei fuse completely to form a larger secondary nucleus with a single secondary nucleolus (4, 5). The basidium increases in size after the primary nuclei fuse, and the nucleus migrates towards the end of the basidia (6, 7). During this time, the nucleus develops vacuoles "filled by the nuclear sap in the living cell". Chromosomes are produced from the nucleolar threads, and align transversely near the apex of the basidium, connected by spindles (8–10). The chromosomes then move to the poles, forming the daughter nuclei that occupy different positions in the basidium; the daughters now have a structure similar to that of the parent nuclei (11). The two nuclei then divide to form four nuclei, similar to fungi with four-spored basidia (12, 13). The four nuclei crowd together at some distance from the end of the basidium to form an irregular mass (14). Shortly thereafter, the sterigmata (slender projections of the basidia that attach the spores) begin to form (15), and cytoplasm begins to pass through the sterigmata to form the spores (16). Although Lewis was not able to clearly determine from observation alone whether the contents of two or four nuclei passed through the sterigmata, he deduced, by examining older basidia with mature spores, that only two nuclei enter the spores (16, 17).

=== Genome ===
The Amanita Genome Project was begun in Jonathan Walton's lab at Michigan State University in 2004 as part of their ongoing studies of A. bisporigera. The purpose of the project is to determine the genes and genetic controls associated with the formation of mycorrhizae, and to elucidate the biochemical mechanisms of toxin production. The genome of A. bisporigera has been sequenced using a combination of automated Sanger sequencing and pyrosequencing, and the genome sequence information is publicly searchable. The sequence data enabled the researchers to identify the genes responsible for amatoxin and phallotoxin biosynthesis, AMA1 and PHA1. The cyclic peptides are synthesized on ribosomes, and require proline-specific peptidases from the prolyl oligopeptidase family for processing.

The genetic sequence information from A. bisporigera has been used to identify molecular polymorphisms in the related A. phalloides. These single-nucleotide polymorphisms may be used as population genetic markers to study phylogeography and population genetics. Sequence information has also been employed to show that A. bisporigera lacks many of the major classes of secreted enzymes that break down the complex polysaccharides of plant cell walls, like cellulose. In contrast, saprobic fungi like Coprinopsis cinerea and Galerina marginata, which break down organic matter to obtain nutrients, have a more complete complement of cell wall-degrading enzymes. Although few ectomycorrhizal fungi have yet been tested in this way, the authors suggest that the absence of plant cell wall-degrading ability may correlate with the ectomycorrhizal ecological niche.

=== Similar species ===
The color and general appearance of A. bisporigera are similar to those of A. verna and A. virosa. A. bisporigera is at times smaller and more slender than either A. verna or A. virosa, but it varies considerably in size; therefore size is not a reliable diagnostic characteristic. A. virosa fruits in autumn—later than A. bisporigera. A. elliptosperma is less common but widely distributed in the southeastern United States, while A. ocreata is found on the West Coast and in the Southwest. Other similar toxic North American species include Amanita magnivelaris, which has a cream-colored, rather thick, felted-submembranous, skirt-like ring, and A. virosiformis, which has elongated spores that are 3.9–4.7 by 11.7–13.4 μm. Neither A. elliptosperma nor A. magnivelaris typically turn yellow with the application of KOH; the KOH reaction of A. virosiformis has not been reported.

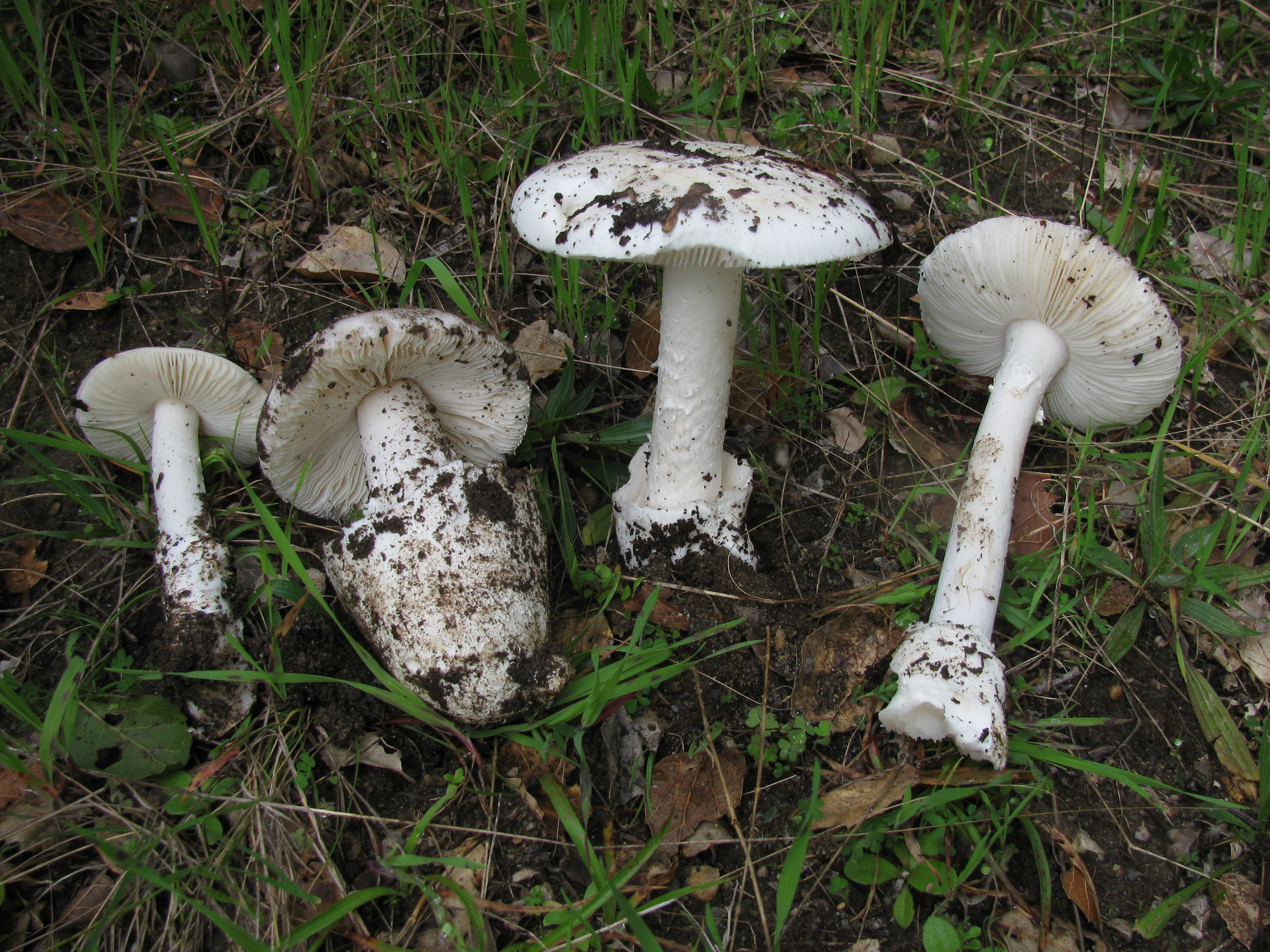
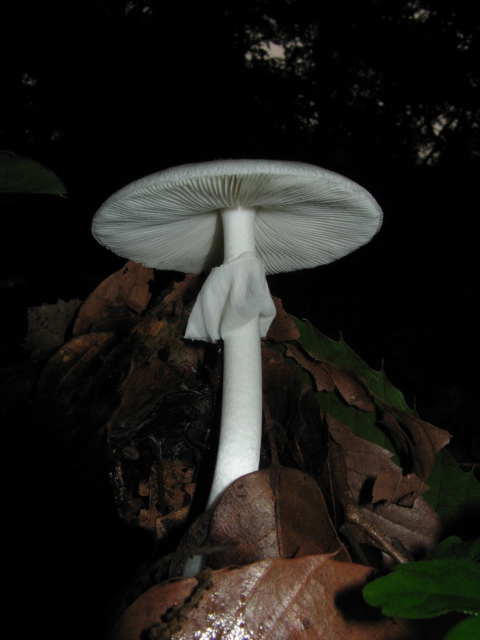
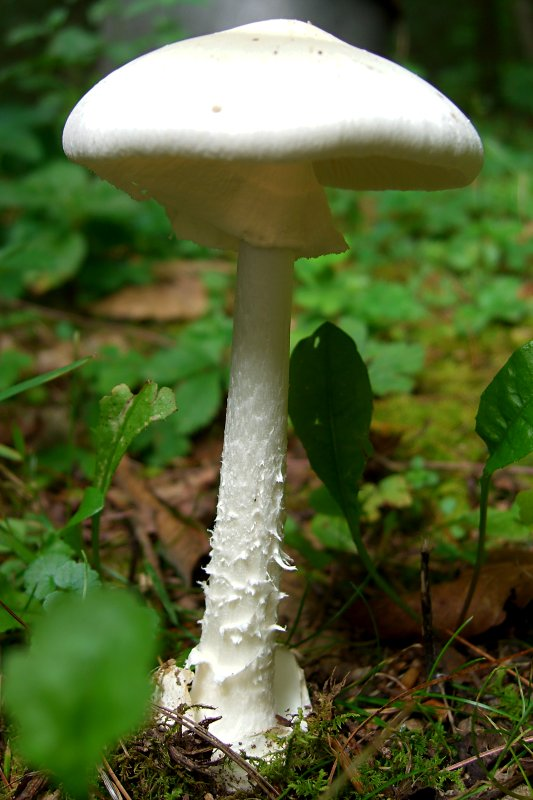
A trio of deadly angels: Amanita ocreata (left); A. verna (middle); A. virosa (right)

Leucoagaricus leucothites is another all-white mushroom with an annulus, free gills, and white spore print, but it lacks a volva and has thick-walled dextrinoid (staining red-brown in Melzer's reagent) egg-shaped spores with a pore. A. bisporigera may also be confused with the larger edible species Agaricus silvicola, the "horse-mushroom". Like many white amanitas, young fruit bodies of A. bisporigera, still enveloped in the universal veil, can be confused with puffball species, but a longitudinal cut of the fruit body reveals internal structures in the Amanita that are absent in puffballs. In 2006, seven members of the Hmong community living in Minnesota were poisoned with A. bisporigera because they had confused it with edible paddy straw mushrooms (Volvariella volvacea) that grow in Southeast Asia.

== Distribution and ecology ==
It is most commonly found in eastern North America, and rare in western North America. It is widely distributed in Canada, and its range extends south to Mexico. The species has also been found in Colombia, where it may have been introduced from trees exported for use in pine plantations.

Like most other Amanita species, A. bisporigera is thought to form mycorrhizal relationships with trees. This is a mutually beneficial relationship where the hyphae of the fungus grow around the roots of trees, enabling the fungus to receive moisture, protection and nutritive byproducts of the tree, and giving the tree greater access to soil nutrients. Fruit bodies of A. bisporigera are found on the ground growing either solitarily, scattered, or in groups in mixed coniferous and deciduous forests; they tend to appear during summer and early fall. The fruit bodies are commonly found near oak, but have been reported in birch-aspen areas in the west.

This mushroom has been recorded – sometimes under the names of its European relative A.virosa and possibly also as A.verna – as a secondary food source for adults of the pleasing fungus beetle Tritoma biguttata affinis. The related T.humeralis has also been recorded from this mushroom, but for this beetle species A. bisporigera does not seem to be a regular food source.

== Toxicity ==
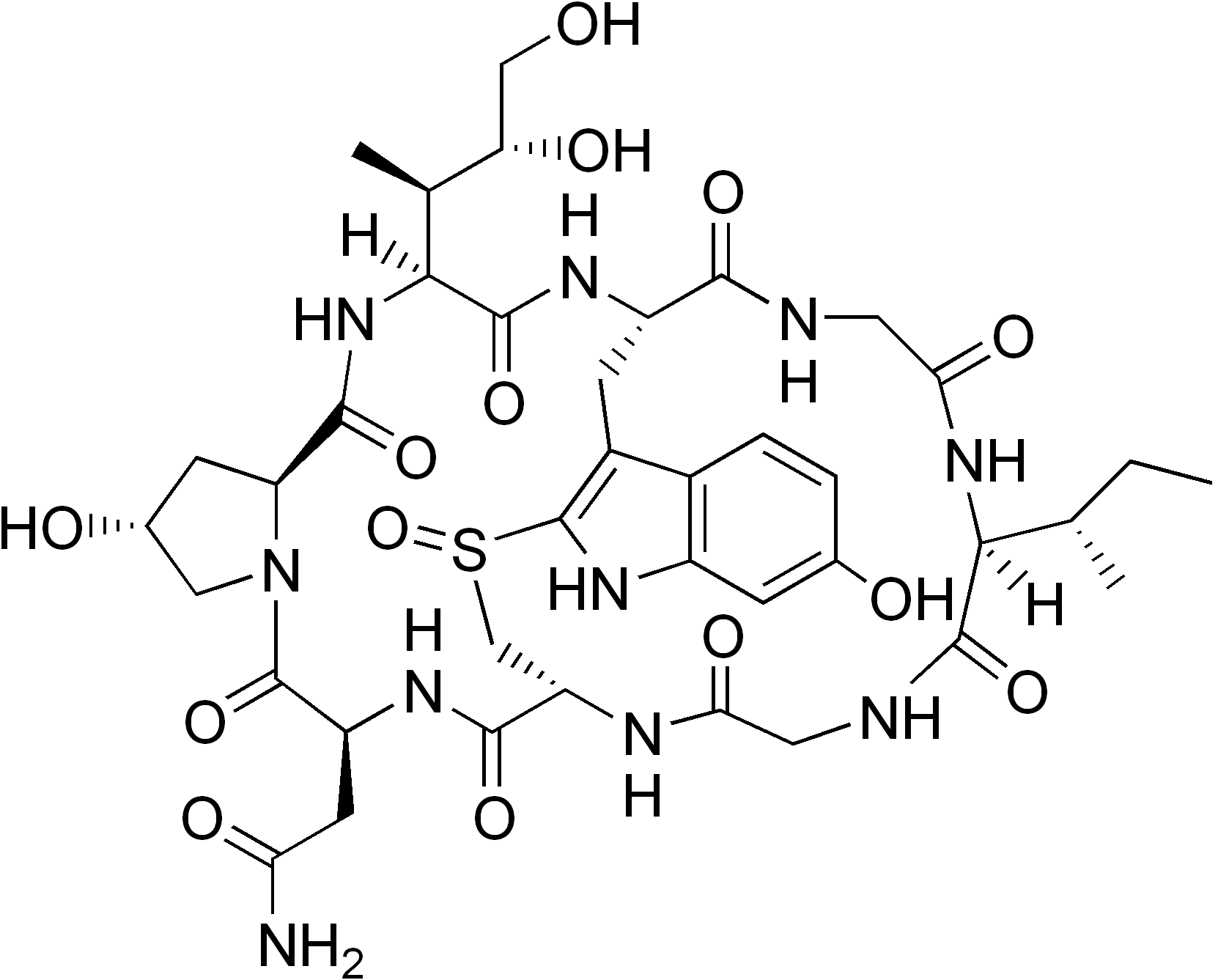
α-amanitin, principal toxic component of A. bisporigera

A. bisporigera is considered the most toxic North American Amanita mushroom, with little variation in toxin content between different fruit bodies. Three subtypes of amatoxin have been described: α-, β, and γ-amanitin. The principal amatoxin, α-amanitin, is readily absorbed across the intestine, and 60% of the absorbed toxin is excreted into bile and undergoes enterohepatic circulation; the kidneys clear the remaining 40%. The toxin inhibits the enzyme RNA polymerase II, thereby interfering with DNA transcription, which suppresses RNA production and protein synthesis. This causes cellular necrosis, especially in cells which are initially exposed and have rapid rates of protein synthesis. This process results in severe acute liver dysfunction and, ultimately, liver failure. Amatoxins are not broken down by boiling, freezing, or drying. Roughly 0.2 to 0.4 milligrams of α-amanitin is present in 1 gram of A. bisporigera; the lethal dose in humans is less than 0.1 mg/kg body weight. One mature fruit body can contain 10–12 mg of α-amanitin, enough for a lethal dose. The α-amanitin concentration in the spores is about 17% that of the fruit body tissues. A. bisporigera also contains the phallotoxin phallacidin, structurally related to the amatoxins but considered less poisonous because of poor absorption. Poisonings (from similar white amanitas) have also been reported in domestic animals, including dogs, cats, and cows.

The first reported poisonings resulting in death from the consumption of A. bisporigera were from near San Antonio, Mexico, in 1957, where a rancher, his wife, and three children consumed the fungus; only the man survived. Amanita poisoning is characterized by the following distinct stages: the incubation stage is an asymptomatic period which ranges from 6 to 12 hours after ingestion. In the gastrointestinal stage, about 6 to 16 hours after ingestion, there is onset of abdominal pain, explosive vomiting, and diarrhea for up to 24 hours, which may lead to dehydration, severe electrolyte imbalances, and shock. These early symptoms may be related to other toxins such as phalloidin. In the cytotoxic stage, 24 to 48 hours after ingestion, clinical and biochemical signs of liver damage are observed, but the patient is typically free of gastrointestinal symptoms. The signs of liver dysfunction such as jaundice, hypoglycemia, acidosis, and hemorrhage appear. Later, there is an increase in the levels of prothrombin and blood levels of ammonia, and the signs of hepatic encephalopathy and/or kidney failure appear. The risk factors for mortality that have been reported are age younger than 10 years, short latency period between ingestion and onset of symptoms, severe coagulopathy (blood clotting disorder), severe hyperbilirubinemia (jaundice), and rising serum creatinine levels.

== See also ==
- List of Amanita species
- List of deadly fungi
- Silibinin – a liver-protecting compound used in cases of Amanita mushroom poisoning
