= Destroying angel =

Deadly and poisonous fungus

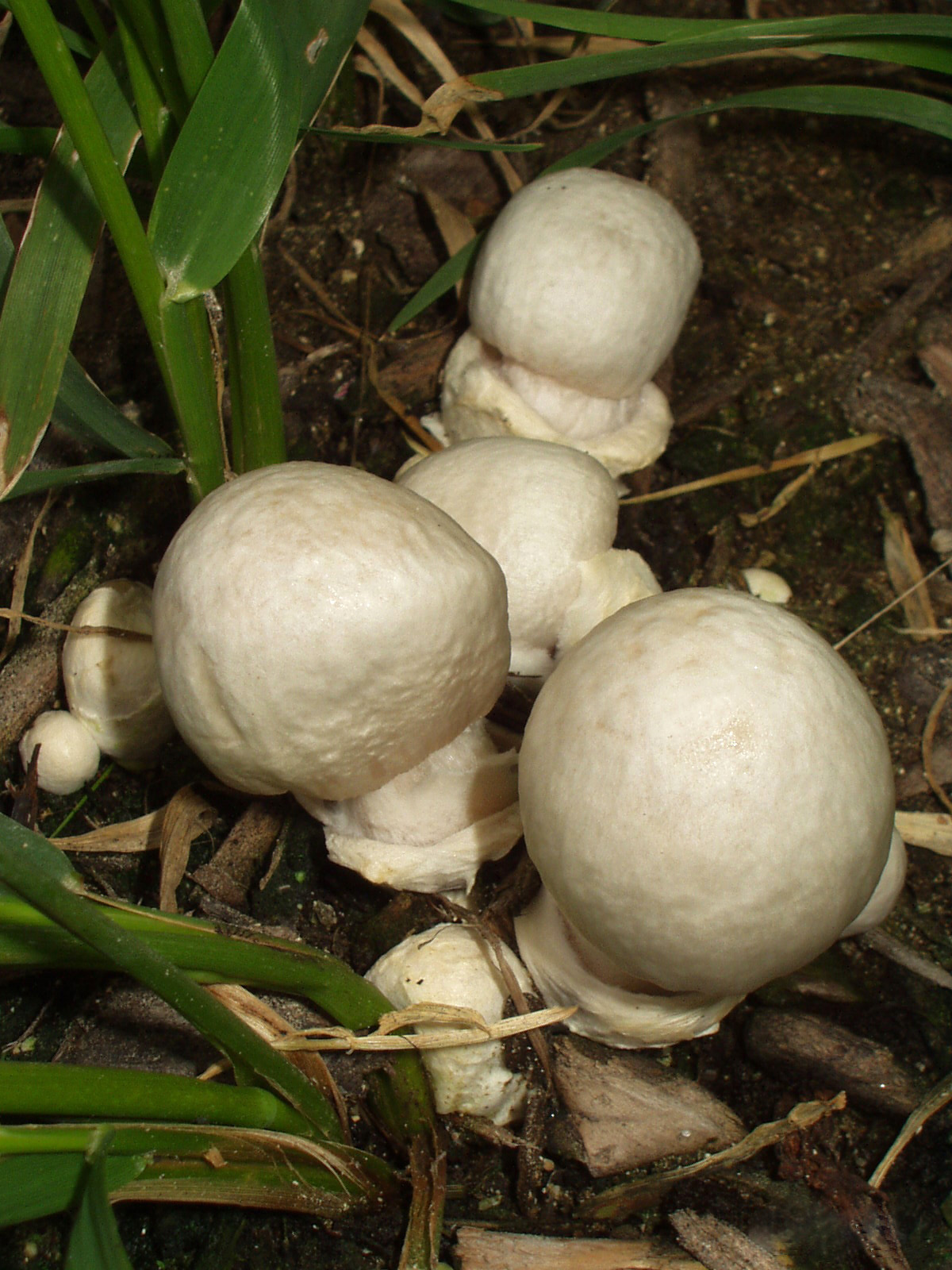
Young specimens like this are sometimes confused with puffballs or other non-deadly mushrooms.

Destroying angels are several similar, closely related species of deadly all-white mushrooms in the genus Amanita. They are Amanita virosa in Europe and A. bisporigera and A. ocreata in eastern and western North America, respectively. Another European species of Amanita referred to as the destroying angel, Amanita verna—also referred to as the "fool's mushroom"—was first described in France in 1780. Destroying angels are among the most toxic known mushrooms; both they and the closely related death caps (A. phalloides) contain amatoxins.

== Description ==
Destroying angels are characterized by having gills and white stalks. The cap can be pure white, or white at the edge and yellowish, pinkish, or tan at the center. It has a partial veil, or ring (annulus) circling the upper stalk, and the gills are "free", not attached to the stalk. Perhaps the most telltale of the features is the presence of a volva, or universal veil, so called because it is a membrane that encapsulates the entire mushroom, rather like an egg, when it is very young. This structure breaks as the young mushroom expands, leaving parts that can be found at the base of the stalk as a boot or cup-like structure, and patches of removable material are found on the cap surface. This combination of features, all found together in the same mushroom, is the hallmark of the family. While other families may have any one or two of these features, none has them all. The cap is usually about 5–12 cm (2–4 1/2 in) across; the stipe is usually 7.5–20 cm (3–8 in) long and about 0.5–2 cm (1/4–3/4 in) thick. They are found singly or in small groups.

Destroying angels can be mistaken for edible fungi such as the button mushroom, meadow mushroom, or horse mushroom. Young destroying angels that are still enclosed in their universal veils can be mistaken for puffballs, but slicing them in half longitudinally reveals internal mushroom structures. This is the basis for the common recommendation to slice in half all puffball-like mushrooms picked when mushroom hunting. Mushroom hunters recommend that people know how to recognize both the death cap and the destroying angel in all of their forms before collecting any white-gilled mushroom for consumption.

== Distribution and habitat ==
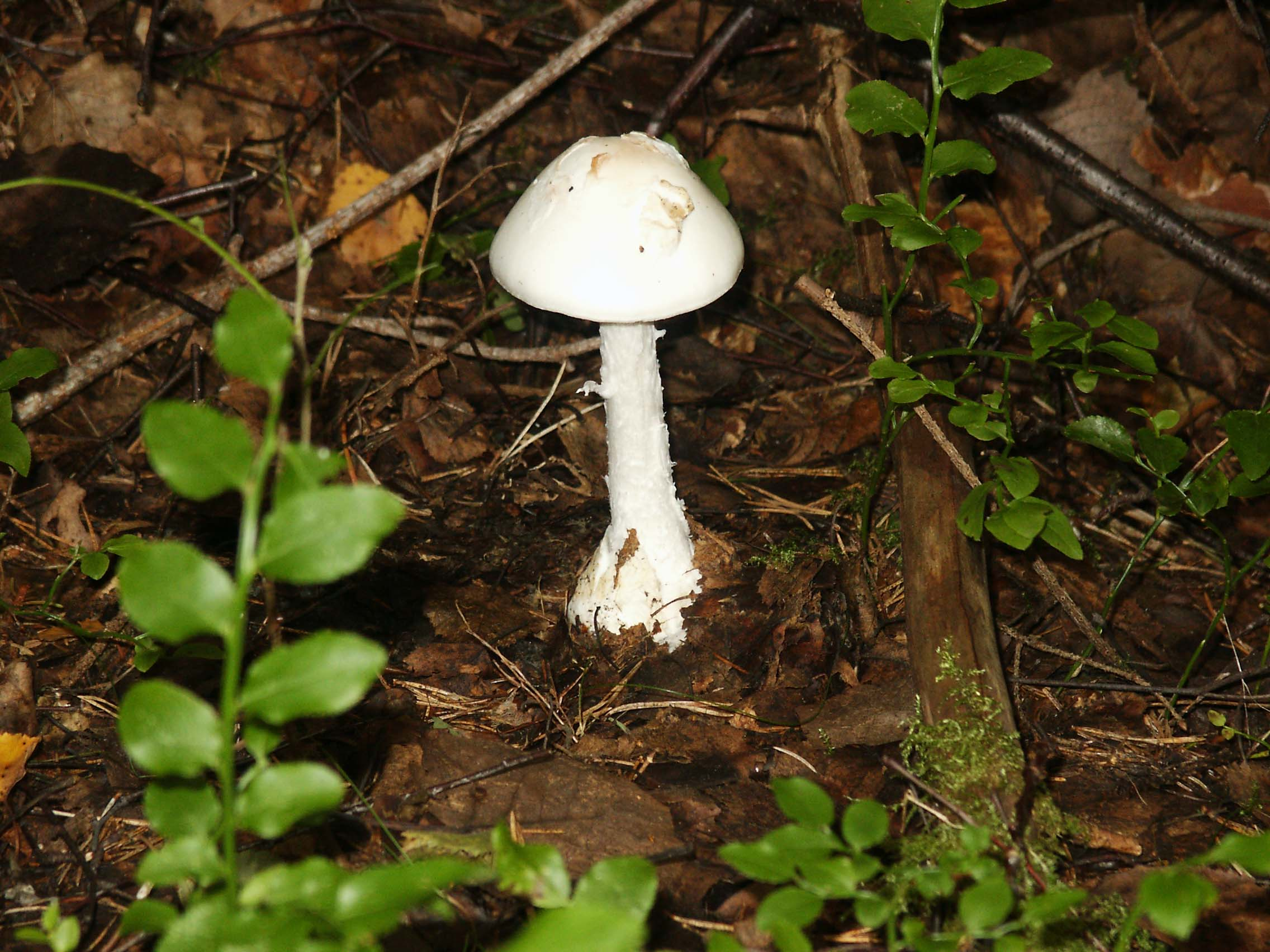
A growing destroying angel (specifically the species Amanita virosa) in Ludvika, Sweden

All Amanita species form ectomycorrhizal relationships with the roots of certain trees. Thus, destroying angels grow in or near the edges of woodlands. They can also be found on lawns or grassy meadows near trees or shrubs. Several species called destroying angels are found all over the world. Amanita bisporigera is associated with oaks and conifers.

== Toxicity ==
The destroying angel (A. bisporigera) and the death cap (A. phalloides) account for the overwhelming majority of deaths due to mushroom poisoning. The toxin responsible for this is amatoxin, which inhibits RNA polymerase II and III. Symptoms do not appear for 5 to 24 hours, when the toxins may already be absorbed and the damage (destruction of liver and kidney tissues) is irreversible. As little as half a mushroom cap can be fatal if the victim is not treated quickly enough. The symptoms include vomiting, cramps, delirium, convulsions, and diarrhea. In one study, people who had ingested the toxin were treated with "fluid and electrolyte replacement, oral activated charcoal and lactulose, IV penicillin, combined hemodialysis and hemoperfusion in two 8-hour sessions," some with "IV thioctic acid, others IV silibinin" and all received a "special diet". A report concluded that "intensive combined treatment applied in these cases is effective in relieving patients with both moderate and severe amanitin poisoning."

== List of destroying angels ==
- Amanita albolimbata
- Amanita amerivirosa
- Amanita bisporigera
- Amanita eburnea
- Amanita elliptosperma
- Amanita exitialis
- Amanita franzii
- Amanita gwyniana
- Amanita helmettensis nom. prov.
- Amanita hygroscopica
- Amanita magnivelaris
- Amanita oberwinklerana
- Amanita ocreata
- Amanita parviformis
- Amanita pseudoverna
- Amanita sp-S04 cryptonom. temp.
- Amanita sturgeonii
- Amanita subjunquillea var. alba
- Amanita verna
- Amanita verniformis
- Amanita virosa
- Amanita virosiformis

== See also ==
- List of Amanita species
- List of deadly fungus species
