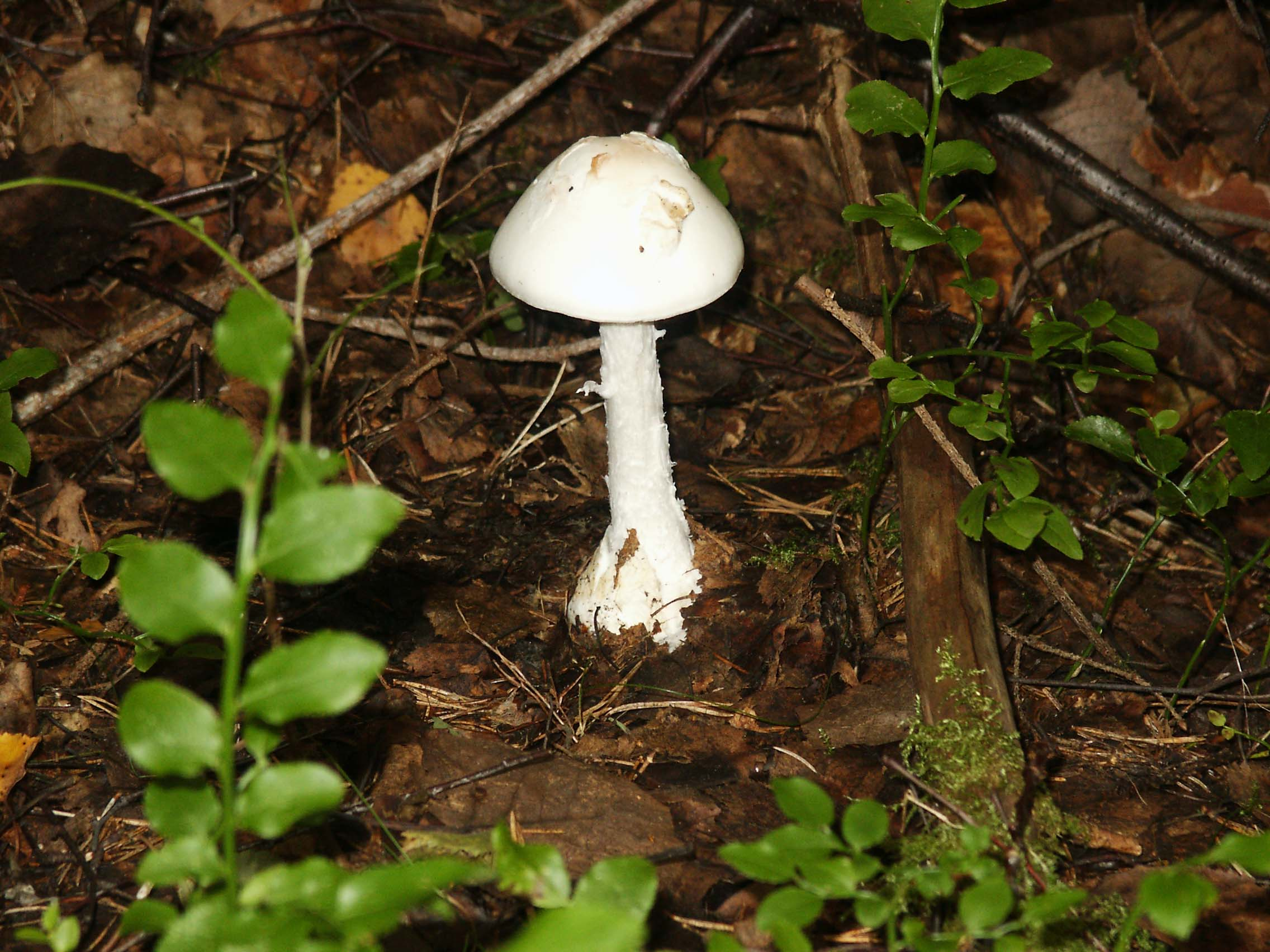

Scientific classification
- Kingdom: Fungi
- Division: Basidiomycota
- Class: Agaricomycetes
- Order: Agaricales
- Family: Amanitaceae
- Genus: Amanita
- Species: A. virosa

Binomial name
- Amanita virosa Bertill. (1866)

Synonyms
- Agaricus virosus Fr. (1838) (nom. illegit.)

= Amanita virosa =

Destroying angel

Species of fungus

Amanita virosa
- Mycological characteristics
- Gills on hymenium
- Cap is convex or flat
- Hymenium is free
- Stipe has a ring and volva
- Spore print is white
- Ecology is mycorrhizal
- Edibility is deadly

Amanita virosa is a species of fungus in the class Agaricomycetes. In the UK, it has the recommended English name of destroying angel and is known internationally as the European destroying angel. Basidiocarps (fruit bodies) are agaricoid (mushroom-shaped) and pure white with a ring on the stipe and a sack-like volva at the base.

The species occurs in Europe and northern Asia. It was formerly reported from North America, but similar-looking American species like A. bisporigera and A. ocreata are distinct. As the name suggests, the destroying angel is poisonous.

== Taxonomy ==
Amanita virosa was first described in 1838 by Swedish mycologist Elias Magnus Fries as Agaricus virosus, but this name is illegitimate since it had already been used for an earlier and different species. Amanita virosa was legitimately published by French mycologist Louis-Adolphe Bertillon in 1866.

== Etymology ==
The specific epithet is derived from the Latin adjective virōsus meaning 'toxic' (compare virus).

== Description ==
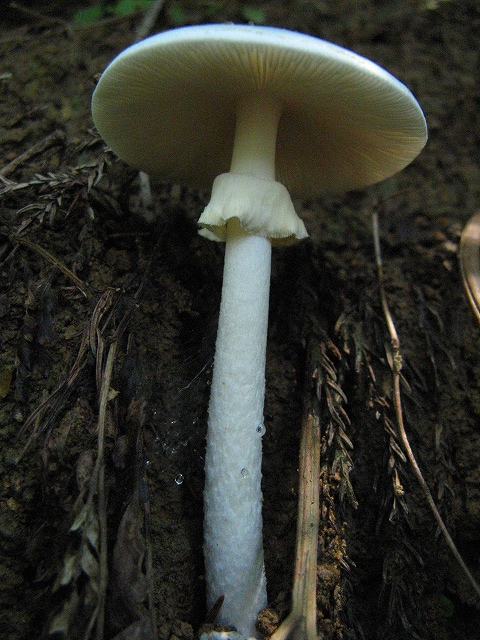
Mature specimen of Amanita virosa showing veil ring on stipe

Amanita virosa first appears as a white, egg-shaped object covered with a universal veil. As it expands, the mushroom-shaped fruit body breaks free, though ragged patches of veil may persist at the cap edges. The cap is initially conical with inturned edges, before becoming hemispherical and flattening with a diameter up to 12 cm (4 3/4 in). The cap often has a distinctive boss; it is able to be peeled and is white, though the centre may be ivory. The crowded, free gills are white, as is the stipe and volva. The thin stipe is up to 15 cm (5.9 in) tall, with a hanging, grooved ring. The spore print is white and the spores are subglobose and 7–10 μm long. They are amyloid, staining purple with Melzer's reagent. The flesh is white, with a smell reminiscent of radishes, and turns bright yellow with sodium hydroxide.

=== Similar species ===
In Europe, the spring-fruiting Amanita verna is a similar all-white species, as is the autumn-fruiting, white form of Amanita phalloides (deathcap). Both are equally poisonous. In their immature, button-mushroom stage, all these poisonous species could be mistaken for young, white-capped, edible mushrooms (Agaricus species), highlighting the danger of picking immature fruit bodies for food. In general, there are about 22 species that are considered destroying angels.

== Habitat and distribution ==
Amanita virosa is found in woodland in late summer and autumn, especially in association with beech and chestnut, but also with pine, spruce, and fir. As with most Amanita species, it forms a mutually beneficial, ectomycorrhizal relationship with the roots of these trees. Amanita virosa was originally described from Sweden and is known throughout Europe, with additional confirmed records from northern Asia (China). The name was formerly used for similar-looking agarics in North America, but research has shown that these American species, including the eastern Amanita bisporigera, the western A. ocreata, and the northern Amanita amerivirosa, are distinct.

== Toxicity ==
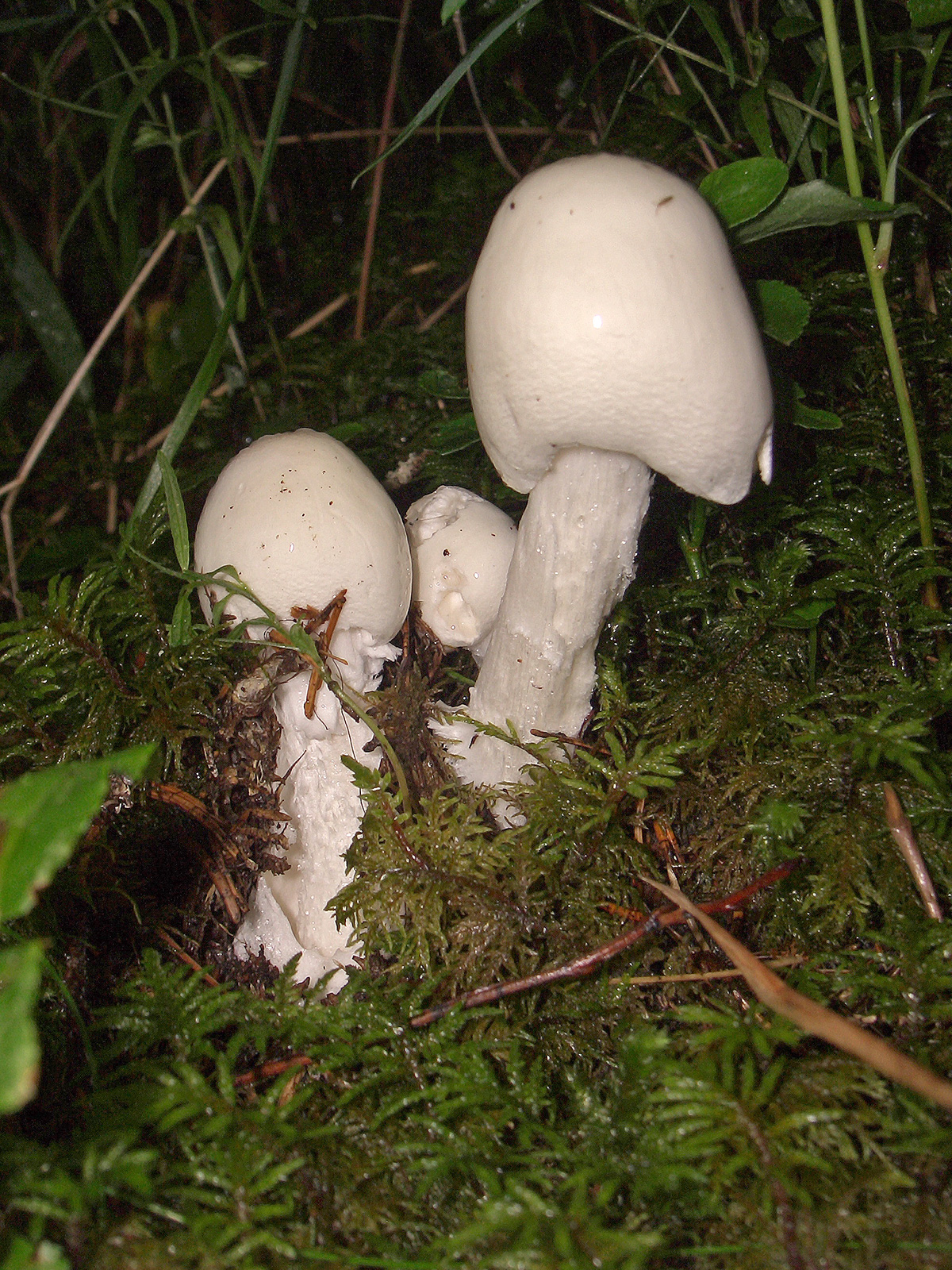
Young fruiting bodies showing conical caps

Amanita virosa is highly toxic, and has been responsible for severe mushroom poisonings. Eating just one cap of A. virosa is enough to kill an adult human. The symptoms of poisoning generally come several hours after consumption, a delay which may make treatment more difficult.

Fruit bodies contain both amatoxins and phallotoxins.

Amatoxins consist of at least eight compounds with a similar structure, that of eight amino-acid rings; they were isolated in 1941 by Heinrich O. Wieland and Rudolf Hallermayer of LMU Munich. Of the amatoxins, α-Amanitin is the chief component and along with β-Amanitin is probably responsible for the toxic effects. Their major toxic mechanism is the inhibition of RNA polymerase II, a vital enzyme in the synthesis of messenger RNA (mRNA), microRNA, and small nuclear RNA, (snRNA). Without mRNA essential protein synthesis and hence cell metabolism cease and the cell dies. The liver is the principal organ affected, as it is the organ which is first encountered after absorption in the gastrointestinal tract, though other organs, especially the kidneys, are susceptible.

Phallotoxins consist of at least seven compounds, all of which have seven similar peptide rings. Phalloidin was isolated in 1937 by Feodor Lynen, Heinrich Wieland's student and son-in-law, and Ulrich Wieland of LMU Munich. Though phallotoxins are highly toxic to liver cells, they have since been found to have little input into the destroying angel's toxicity as they are not absorbed through the gut. Furthermore, phalloidin is also found in the edible Amanita rubescens. Another group of minor active peptides are the virotoxins, which consist of six similar monocyclic heptapeptides. Like the phallotoxins they do not exert any acute toxicity after ingestion in humans.

It is unclear why this fungus, which closely resembles edible species, has been implicated in fewer deaths than the death cap, though its comparative rarity may contribute to this. Some authorities strongly advise against putting fruit bodies in the same basket with those collected for consumption and to avoid handling them. Nevertheless, A. virosa is only toxic when explicitly ingested.

=== Treatment ===
Consumption of Amanita virosa is a medical emergency requiring hospitalization. There are four main categories of therapy for poisoning: preliminary medical care, supportive measures, specific treatments, and liver transplantation.

Preliminary care consists of gastric decontamination with either activated carbon or gastric lavage. However, due to the delay between ingestion and the first symptoms of poisoning, it is commonplace for patients to arrive for treatment many hours after ingestion, potentially reducing the efficacy of these interventions. Supportive measures are directed towards treating the dehydration which results from fluid loss during the gastrointestinal phase of intoxication and correction of metabolic acidosis, hypoglycemia, electrolyte imbalances, and impaired coagulation.

No definitive antidote for amatoxin poisoning is available, but some specific treatments have been shown to improve survivability. High-dose continuous intravenous penicillin G has been reported to be of benefit, though the exact mechanism is unknown, and trials with cephalosporins show promise. There is some evidence that intravenous silibinin, an extract from the blessed milk thistle (Silybum marianum), may be beneficial in reducing the effects of death cap poisoning. Silibinin prevents the uptake of amatoxins by hepatocytes, thereby protecting undamaged hepatic tissue; it also stimulates DNA-dependent RNA polymerases, leading to an increase in RNA synthesis. N-acetylcysteine has shown promise in combination with other therapies. Animal studies indicate the amatoxins deplete hepatic glutathione; N-acetylcysteine serves as a glutathione precursor and may therefore prevent reduced glutathione levels and subsequent liver damage. None of the antidotes used have undergone prospective, randomized clinical trials, and only anecdotal support is available. Silibinin and N-acetylcysteine appear to be the therapies with the most potential benefit. Repeated doses of activated carbon may be helpful by absorbing any toxins that are returned to the gastrointestinal tract following enterohepatic circulation. Other methods of enhancing the elimination of the toxins have been trialed; techniques such as hemodialysis, hemoperfusion, plasmapheresis, and peritoneal dialysis have occasionally yielded success but overall do not appear to improve outcome.

In patients developing liver failure, a liver transplant is often the only option to prevent death. Liver transplants have become a well-established option in amatoxin poisoning. This is a complicated issue, however, as transplants themselves may have significant complications and mortality; patients require long-term immunosuppression to maintain the transplant. That being the case, there has been a reassessment of criteria such as onset of symptoms, prothrombin time (PTT), serum bilirubin, and presence of encephalopathy for determining at what point a transplant becomes necessary for survival. Evidence suggests that, although survival rates have improved with modern medical treatment, in patients with moderate to severe poisoning up to half of those who did recover suffered permanent liver damage. However, a follow-up study has shown that most survivors recover completely without any sequelae if treated within 36 hours of mushroom ingestion.

== Potential uses ==
Amanita virosa extract has antibacterial efficacy against Pseudomonas aeruginosa and Staphylococcus aureus in vitro. It also has shown inhibitory activity on thrombin.

== See also ==
- List of Amanita species
- List of deadly fungi

== Sources ==
- Benjamin, Denis R. (1995). Mushrooms: poisons and panaceas — a handbook for naturalists, mycologists and physicians. New York: WH Freeman and Company. ISBN 978-0-7167-2600-5.
- Jordan Peter; Wheeler Steven. (2001). The Ultimate Mushroom Book. London: Hermes House. ISBN 978-1-85967-092-7.
