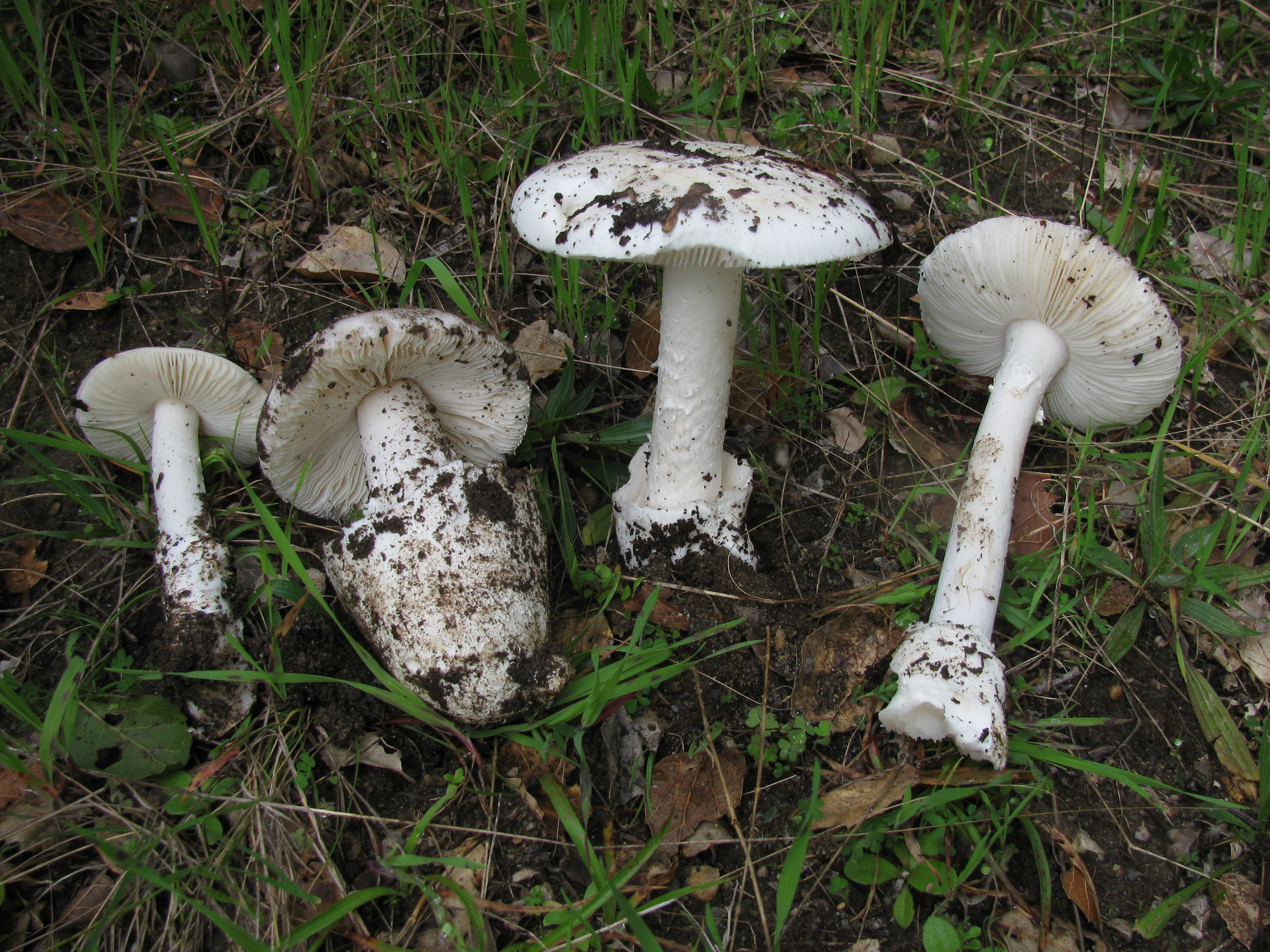

Conservation status
- Least Concern (IUCN 3.1)

Scientific classification
- Kingdom: Fungi
- Division: Basidiomycota
- Class: Agaricomycetes
- Order: Agaricales
- Family: Amanitaceae
- Genus: Amanita
- Species: A. ocreata

Binomial name
- Amanita ocreata Peck
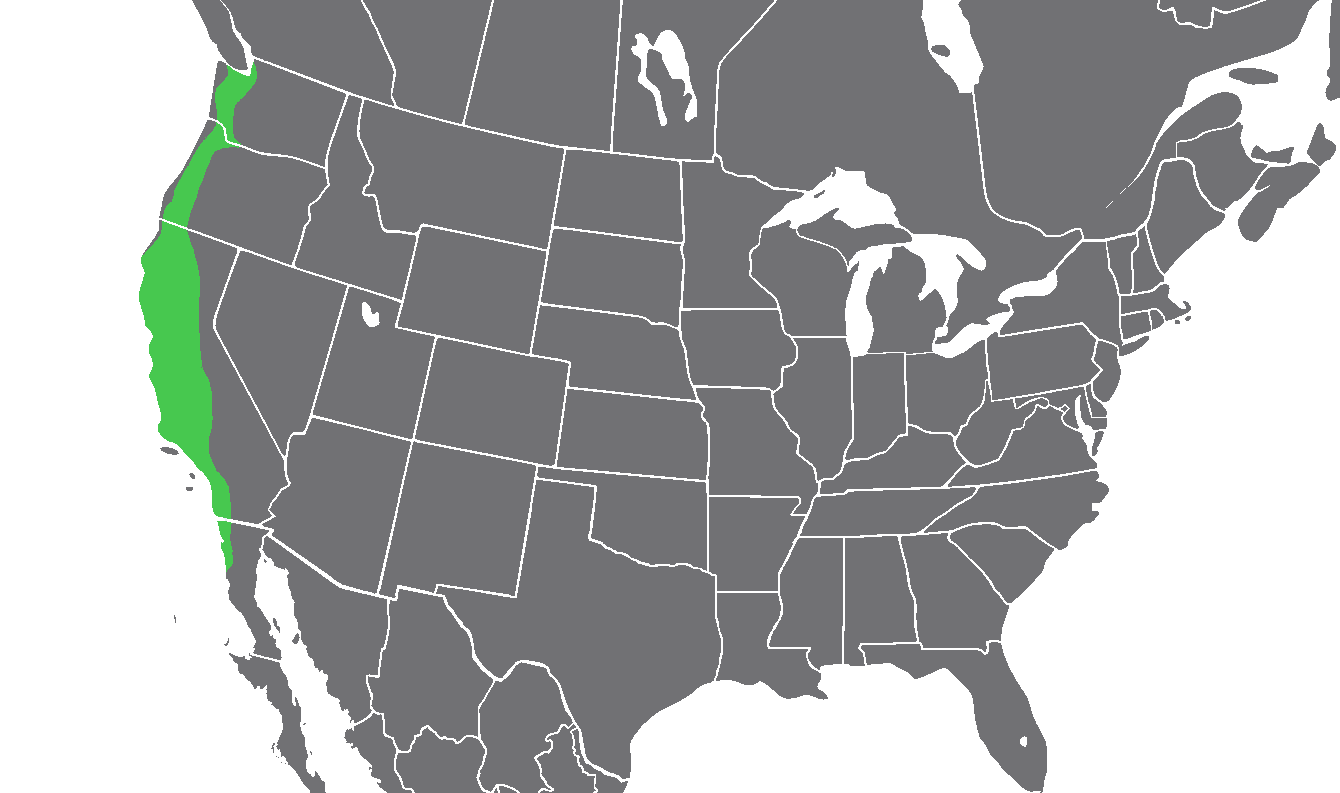
- Approximate distribution (green)

= Amanita ocreata =

Amanita ocreata Western North American destroying angel

Species of poisonous fungus in the genus Amanita

Amanita ocreata
- Mycological characteristics
- Gills on hymenium
- Cap is convex or flat
- Hymenium is free
- Stipe has a ring and volva
- Spore print is white
- Ecology is mycorrhizal
- Edibility is deadly

Amanita ocreata, commonly known as one of the many destroying angels, or more precisely the western North American destroying angel, is a deadly poisonous basidiomycete fungus, one of many in the genus Amanita. The large fruiting bodies (the mushrooms) generally appear in spring; the cap may be white or ochre and often develops a brownish centre, while the stipe, ring, gill and volva are all white. A. ocreata resembles several edible species commonly consumed by humans, increasing the risk of accidental poisoning. Mature fruiting bodies can be confused with the edible A. velosa (springtime amanita), A. lanei or Volvopluteus gloiocephalus, while immature specimens may be difficult to distinguish from edible Agaricus mushrooms or puffballs.

The species occurs in the Pacific Northwest and California Floristic Provinces of North America, associating with oak trees. Similar in toxicity to the death cap (A. phalloides) and destroying angels of Europe (A. virosa) and eastern North America (A. bisporigera), it is a potentially deadly fungus responsible for several poisonings in California. Its principal toxic constituent, α-Amanitin, damages the liver and kidneys, often fatally, and has no known antidote, though silybin and N-acetylcysteine show promise. The initial symptoms are gastrointestinal and include abdominal pain, diarrhea and vomiting. These subside temporarily after 2–3 days, though ongoing damage to internal organs during this time is common; symptoms of jaundice, diarrhea, delirium, seizures, and coma may follow with death from liver failure 6–16 days post ingestion.

== Taxonomy ==
Amanita ocreata was first described by American mycologist Charles Horton Peck in 1909 from material collected by Charles Fuller Baker in Claremont, California. The specific epithet is derived from the Latin ocrěātus 'wearing greaves' from ocrea 'greave', referring to its loose, baggy volva. Amanita bivolvata is a botanical synonym. The mushroom belongs to the same section (Phalloideae) and genus (Amanita) as several deadly poisonous fungi including the death cap (A. phalloides) and several all-white species of Amanita known as "destroying angels": A. bisporigera of eastern North America, and the European A. virosa.

== Description ==
Amanita ocreata is generally stouter than the other fungi termed destroying angels. It first appears as a white egg-shaped object covered with a universal veil. As it grows, the mushroom breaks free, though there may rarely be ragged patches of veil left at the cap edges. The cap is initially hemispherical, before becoming more convex and flattening, sometimes irregularly. This may result in undulations in the cap, which may be between 5–15 centimetres (2–6 inches) in diameter. The colour varies from white, through yellowish-white to shades of ochre, sometimes with a brownish centre. Occasionally parts of the fruiting bodies may have pinkish tones. The rest of the fungus below the cap is white. The crowded gills are adnate to adnexed, or sometimes later free.

The stipe ranges from 6–20 cm (2 1/2–8 in) in height and is about 1–3 cm (1/2–1 1/4 in) thick, bearing a thin white membranous ring until old age. The volva is thin, smooth and sac-like, although may be quite extensive and contain almost half the stipe. The spore print is white, and the subglobose to ovoid to subellipsoid, amyloid spores are 9–14 x 7–10 μm viewed under a microscope. There is typically no smell, though some fruiting bodies may have a slight odour, described as that of bleach or chlorine, dead fish or iodine. Like other destroying angels, the flesh stains yellow when treated with potassium hydroxide.

=== Similar species ===
This fungus resembles the edible mushrooms Agaricus arvensis and A. campestris, and the puffballs (Lycoperdon spp.) before the caps have opened and the gills have become visible, so those collecting immature fungi run the risk of confusing the varieties. It also resembles and grows in the same areas as the edible and prized Amanita velosa, which can be distinguished from A. ocreata by its lack of ring, striate cap margin and thick universal veil remnants comprising the veil. The edible Amanita calyptroderma also has a ring, but is more likely to have veil patches remaining on its cap, which is generally darker. Volvopluteus gloiocephalus has pink spores and no ring or volva.

== Distribution and habitat ==
Appearing from January to April, A. ocreata occurs later in the year than other amanitas except A. calyptroderma. It is found in mixed woodland on the Pacific coast of North America, from Washington south through California to Baja California in Mexico. It may feasibly occur on Vancouver Island in British Columbia though this has never been confirmed. It forms ectomycorrhizal relationships and is found in association with coast live oak (Quercus agrifolia), as well as hazel (Corylus spp.). In Oregon and Washington, it may also be associated with the Garry oak (Quercus garryana).

== Toxicity ==
A. ocreata is highly toxic, and has been responsible for mushroom poisonings in western North America, particularly in the spring. It contains highly toxic amatoxins, as well as phallotoxins, a feature shared with the closely related death cap (A. phalloides), half a cap of which can be enough to kill a human, and other species known as destroying angels. There is some evidence it may be the most toxic of all the North American phalloideae, as a higher proportion of people consuming it had organ damage and 40% perished. Dogs have also been known to consume this fungus in California with fatal results.

Amatoxins consist of at least eight compounds with a similar structure, that of eight amino-acid rings; of those found in A. ocreata, α-Amanitin is the most prevalent and along with β-Amanitin is likely to be responsible for the toxic effects. The major toxic mechanism is the inhibition of RNA polymerase II, a vital enzyme in the synthesis of messenger RNA (mRNA), microRNA, and small nuclear RNA (snRNA). Without mRNA, essential protein synthesis and hence cell metabolism stop and the cell dies. The liver is the principal organ affected, as it is the first organ encountered after absorption by the gastrointestinal tract, though other organs, especially the kidneys, are susceptible to the toxins.

The phallotoxins consist of at least seven compounds, all of which have seven similar peptide rings. Although they are highly toxic to liver cells, phallotoxins have since been found to have little input into the destroying angel's toxicity as they are not absorbed through the gut. Furthermore, one phallotoxin, phalloidin, is also found in the edible (and sought-after) blusher (Amanita rubescens).

=== Signs and symptoms ===
Signs and symptoms of poisoning by A. ocreata are initially gastrointestinal in nature and include colicky abdominal pain, with watery diarrhea and vomiting which may lead to dehydration and, in severe cases, hypotension, tachycardia, hypoglycemia, and acid-base disturbances. The initial symptoms resolve two to three days after ingestion of the fungus. A more serious deterioration signifying liver involvement may then occur—jaundice, diarrhea, delirium, seizures, and coma due to fulminant liver failure and attendant hepatic encephalopathy caused by the accumulation of normally liver-removed substances in the blood. Kidney failure (either secondary to severe hepatitis or caused by direct toxic renal damage) and coagulopathy may appear during this stage. Life-threatening complications include increased intracranial pressure, intracranial hemorrhage, sepsis, pancreatitis, acute kidney injury, and cardiac arrest. Death generally occurs six to sixteen days after the poisoning.

=== Treatment ===
Consumption of A. ocreata is a medical emergency that requires hospitalization. There are four main categories of therapy for poisoning: preliminary medical care, supportive measures, specific treatments, and liver transplantation.

Preliminary care consists of gastric decontamination with either activated carbon or gastric lavage. However, due to the delay between ingestion and the first symptoms of poisoning, it is commonplace for patients to arrive for treatment long after ingestion, potentially reducing the efficacy of these interventions. Supportive measures are directed towards treating the dehydration which results from fluid loss during the gastrointestinal phase of intoxication and correction of metabolic acidosis, hypoglycemia, electrolyte imbalances, and impaired coagulation.

No definitive antidote for amatoxin poisoning is available, but some specific treatments such as intravenous penicillin G have been shown to improve survival. There is some evidence that intravenous silibinin, an extract from the blessed milk thistle (Silybum marianum), may be beneficial in reducing the effects of amatoxins, preventing their uptake by hepatocytes, thereby protecting undamaged hepatic tissue. In patients developing liver failure, a liver transplant is often the only option to prevent death. Liver transplants have become a well-established option in amatoxin poisoning. This is a complicated issue, however, as transplants themselves may have significant complications and mortality; patients require long-term immunosuppression to maintain the transplant. Evidence suggests that, although survival rates have improved with modern medical treatment, in patients with moderate to severe poisoning up to half of those who did recover suffered permanent liver damage. However, a follow-up study has shown that most survivors recover completely without any sequelae if treated within 36 hours of the mushrooms ingestion.

== See also ==
- List of Amanita species
- List of deadly fungi
