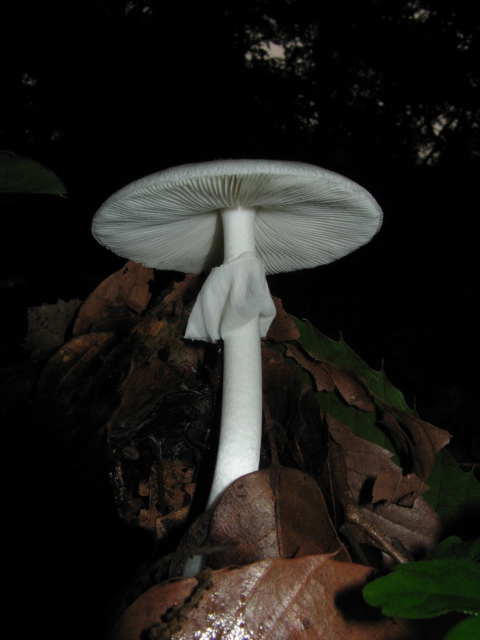

Scientific classification
- Kingdom: Fungi
- Division: Basidiomycota
- Class: Agaricomycetes
- Order: Agaricales
- Family: Amanitaceae
- Genus: Amanita
- Species: A. verna

Binomial name
- Amanita verna (Bull.) Lam. (1783)

Synonyms
- Agaricus bulbosus f. vernus Bull. (1780); Agaricus vernus (Bull.) Bull. (1783); Amanita virosa Secr. (1833); Agaricus virosus var. vernus (Bull.) Fr. (1838); Amanita phalloides var. verna (Bull.) Lanzi (1916); Amanita verna var. grisea Massee (1922); Amanitina verna (Bull.) E.-J.Gilbert (1941); Amanita verna f. ellipticospora E.-J.Gilbert (1941); Venenarius vernus (Bull.) Murrill (1948)

= Amanita verna =

Poisonous mushroom

Amanita verna
- Mycological characteristics
- Gills on hymenium
- Cap is convex or flat
- Hymenium is free
- Stipe has a ring and volva
- Spore print is white
- Ecology is mycorrhizal
- Edibility is deadly

Amanita verna, commonly known as the fool's mushroom or the spring destroying angel (see destroying angel), is a deadly poisonous basidiomycete fungus, one of many in the genus Amanita. Occurring in Europe in spring, A. verna associates with various deciduous and coniferous trees. The caps, stipes and gills are all white in colour.

== Taxonomy ==
Amanita verna was first mentioned in the scientific literature by French mycologist Jean Bulliard in 1780 as form vernus of Agaricus bulbosus. Bulliard warned that it could be easily confused with the edible field mushroom (Agaricus campestris), and that remedies for those who had eaten it included putting vitriolic ether in wine or crushed garlic in milk. The species name verna is derived from the Latin word for "spring". Three years later, Jean-Baptiste Lamarck gave it distinct species status in his Encyclopédie Méthodique, Botanique.

A. verna is a close relative of A. phalloides (the death cap); both species belong to the Amanita subfamily Phalloideae.

== Description ==
The fool's mushroom is pure white, all the way to the gills and the stipe. This fungus, like many but not all amanitas, has a volva. The fool's mushroom's cap is 5–10 centimetres (2–4 inches) wide, and is about the same height.

This mushroom's lamellae are free and white, and the volva is bag-like and large. Its annulus is white and membranous, and A. verna react yellow with 20% potassium hydroxide solution, unlike its relative Amanita phalloides var. alba while Amanita virosa gets an orange-yellow reaction. The mushroom's spores are smooth and elliptical.

== Distribution and habitat ==
The fool's mushroom grows in European woodlands and hardwood forests in springtime as the fungus' Latin name (Amanita verna or spring destroying angel) suggests.

Unlike various closely related poisonous amanitas, this mushroom is not known to occur in North America.

== Toxicity ==
Closely related to other deadly pure white amanitas, the fool's mushroom is one of the most poisonous mushrooms in the world. Just like the death cap, this organism contains a fatal dose of alpha-amanitin, which causes liver failure if not treated immediately. While this mushroom (along with many other deadly and edible fungi) also contains phallotoxins, these phallotoxins are not toxic to humans (when ingested) as they are poorly absorbed.

This mushroom's toxicity and symptoms are similar to that of the death cap. In fact, high-performance liquid chromatography analyses have shown that the concentrations of alpha-amanitin and beta-amanitin are higher in A. verna, potentially making it the most toxic Amanita species. Like other members of the subfamily Phalloideae, the fool's mushroom has been implicated in a number of serious or fatal poisonings.

There are no negative symptoms from eating this fungus until 6–24 hours after ingestion. The first symptom is simply unease. Violent cramps and diarrhea follow. On the third day these symptoms remiss before the final onset of symptoms in following days, which include kidney and liver failure due to amatoxins. At this point, drastic measures like liver transplant need to be taken, or the victim will likely die.

== See also ==
- Amanitin
- List of Amanita species
- List of deadly fungi
