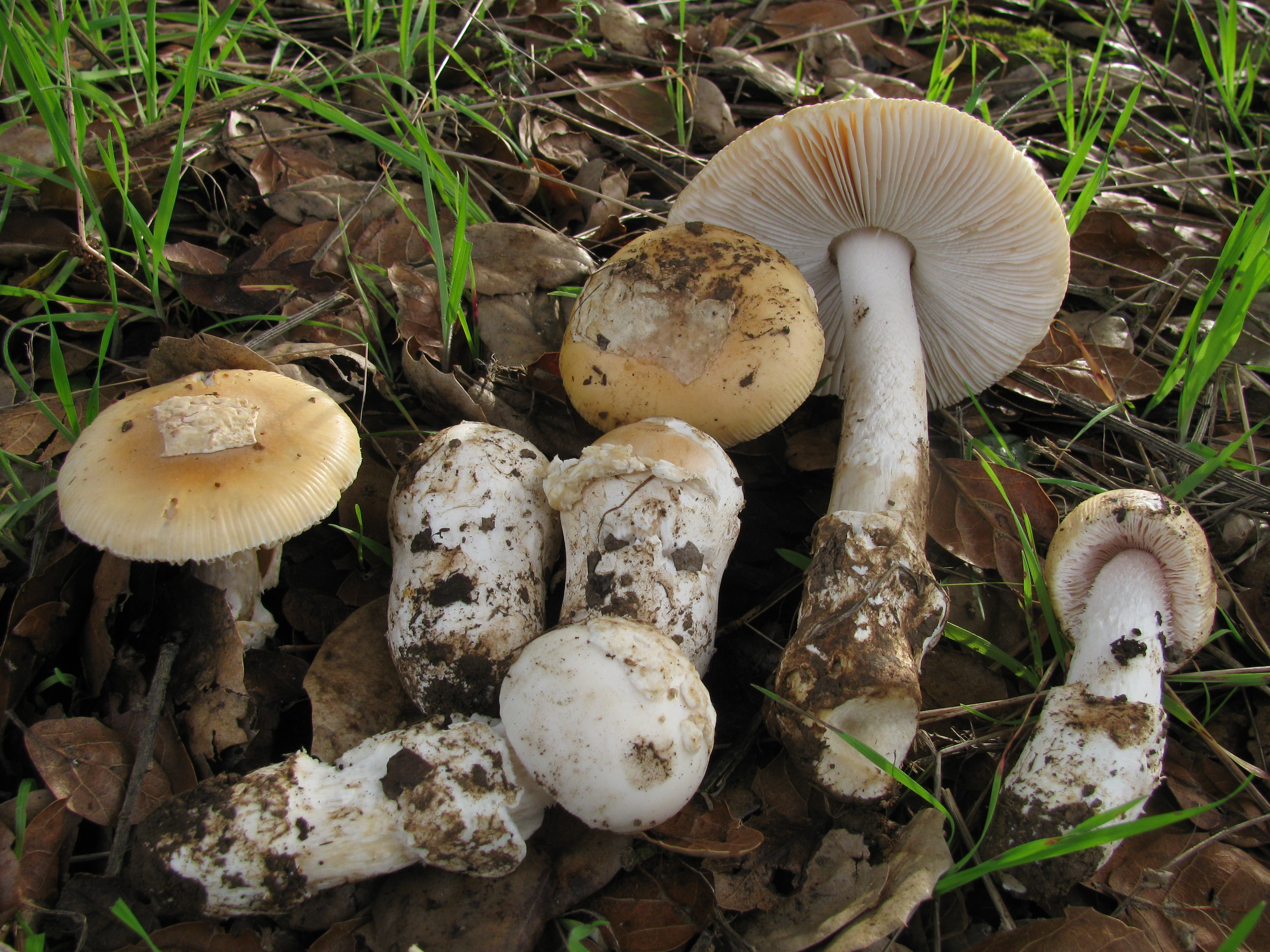

Scientific classification
- Kingdom: Fungi
- Division: Basidiomycota
- Class: Agaricomycetes
- Order: Agaricales
- Family: Amanitaceae
- Genus: Amanita
- Species: A. velosa

Binomial name
- Amanita velosa (Peck) Lloyd (1898)

Synonyms
- Amanitopsis velosa Peck (1895)

= Amanita velosa =

Species of fungus

Amanita velosa
- Mycological characteristics
- Gills on hymenium
- Cap is convex
- Hymenium is free
- Stipe has a volva
- Spore print is white
- Ecology is mycorrhizal
- Edibility is choice but not recommended

Amanita velosa, commonly known as the springtime amanita, or bittersweet orange ringless amanita is a species of agaric found in California, as well as southern Oregon and Baja California. Although a prized edible mushroom, it bears similarities to some deadly poisonous species.

== Description ==
It is part of Amanita section Vaginatae, and like other species in this group, it is characterized by its lack of an annulus, striate pileus margin, thick universal veil remnants comprising the veil, volva, and pileus patches, inamyloid spores, and lack of characteristic Amanita toxins such as amatoxins and ibotenic acid. It is distinguished from other species in section Vaginatae by its lack of any kind of umbo on its pileus, its short pileus striae, and its distinct pale orange to pale salmon coloration when young. Its coloration can become more brownish with age and entirely white specimens are occasionally seen as well. Like many other Amanita, the gills are white, but occasionally have a distinct pinkish or orangish tint. In older specimens, the odor can become pungent and fishy.

The cap is 5–15 cm wide, convex then plane, with an orange-pink or salmon-like color; it usually has a white universal veil patch. The gills are adnexed to free, close and white (or pinkish with age). The stalk is 5–15 cm long, and 1–3 cm wide. The volva is white, saclike and sheathes the stalk base. The spores are white, smooth, elliptical, and inamyloid.

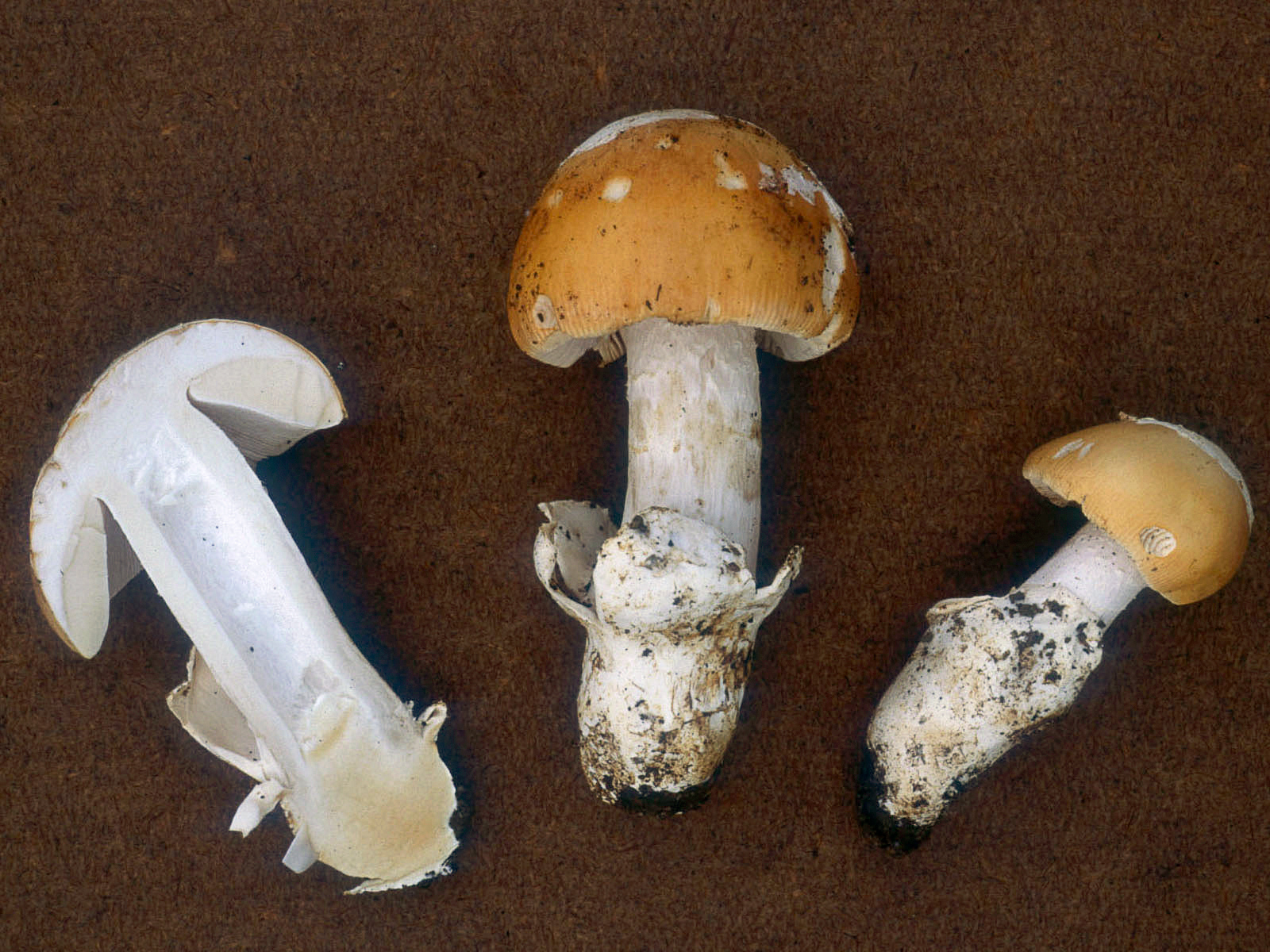
A. velosa specimens

=== Similar species ===
The deadly A. ocreata and occasionally A. phalloides are found in the same habitat at the same time of year as A. velosa, and can often be found in close proximity. A. ocreata and A. phalloides have thin universal veil remnants, a sac-like volva, an annulus, a non-striate pileus margin, and a pileus that is a different color than A. velosa. These differences can fade as the fruiting body ages, making it important to collect only specimens that have all of their identifying characteristics intact. A. calyptratoides is very similar.

== Distribution and habitat ==
A. velosa is a late-season mushroom in its range of occurrence, being primarily found in the coastal regions of California, Oregon, and Baja California, from midwinter up until the end of the California rainy season. Its favored habitat is the ecotone between oak (particularly coast live oak) woodlands and open grassland, living in an ectomycorrhizal relationship with young oak trees.

The species is also reported to have been found in association with aspen and conifers in the Sierra Nevada, with one report of it being found growing with spruce in the eastern United States' Great Smoky Mountains National Park.

== Edibility ==
It is considered to be an outstanding edible species with a distinctively sweet or nutty flavor, but great caution must be exercised to properly identify it due to its similarity to deadly species.
