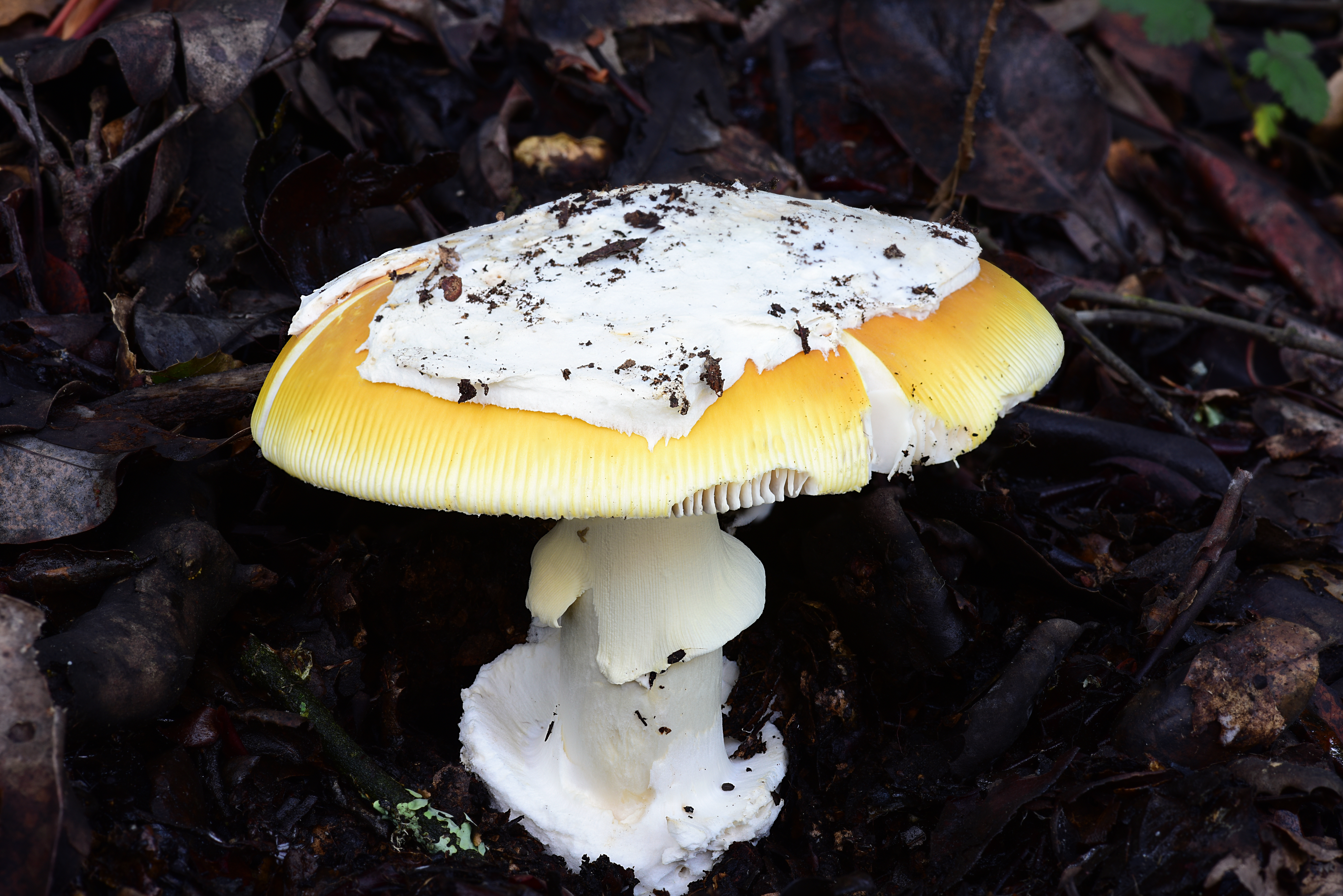

Conservation status
- Least Concern (IUCN 3.1)

Scientific classification
- Kingdom: Fungi
- Division: Basidiomycota
- Class: Agaricomycetes
- Order: Agaricales
- Family: Amanitaceae
- Genus: Amanita
- Species: A. calyptroderma

Binomial name
- Amanita calyptroderma G.F. Atk. & V.G. Ballen 1909

Synonyms
- Amanita calyptrata Amanita lanei

= Amanita calyptroderma =

Species of fungus

Amanita calyptroderma Mycological characteristics
- Gills on hymenium
- Cap is flat or convex
- Hymenium is free
- Stipe has a ring and volva
- Spore print is white
- Ecology is mycorrhizal
- Edibility is edible but not recommended

Amanita calyptroderma also known as coccora, coccoli or the Pacific amanita, is a white-spored mushroom that fruits naturally in the Sierra Nevada and coastal forests of the western United States during the fall, winter and spring.

== Description ==
This mushroom's cap is about 10–25 centimetres (4–10 inches) in diameter, usually orange-brown in color (but sometimes white), and partially covered by a thick white patch of universal veil. It has white, close gills. Its cream-colored stalk is about 10–20 cm in length and 2–4 cm (3/4–1 1/2 in) in width, adorned with a partial veil. It has a partially hollow stem (filled with a stringy white pith), and a large, sacklike volva at the base of the stalk.

The spores of this species, which are white, do not change color when placed in a solution of Melzer's reagent, and thus are termed inamyloid. This characteristic in combination with the skirt-like annulus and absence of a bulb at the base of the stalk place this mushroom in the section Caesareae.

=== Similar species ===
The deadly poisonous A. phalloides is similar in appearance.

Amanita vernicoccora is a closely related edible species, which fruits in hilly or mountainous areas from late winter to spring. Otherwise similar in appearance, its cap is yellow. A. caesarea is also related and edible.

== Distribution and habitat ==
This mushroom occurs in conifer forests, forming mycorrhizae with madrone (Arbutus menziesii) in the southern part of its range (Central California northwards to Washington). However, in the northern part of its range (Washington to southern Canada), its preferred host is Douglas-fir (Pseudotsuga menziesii).

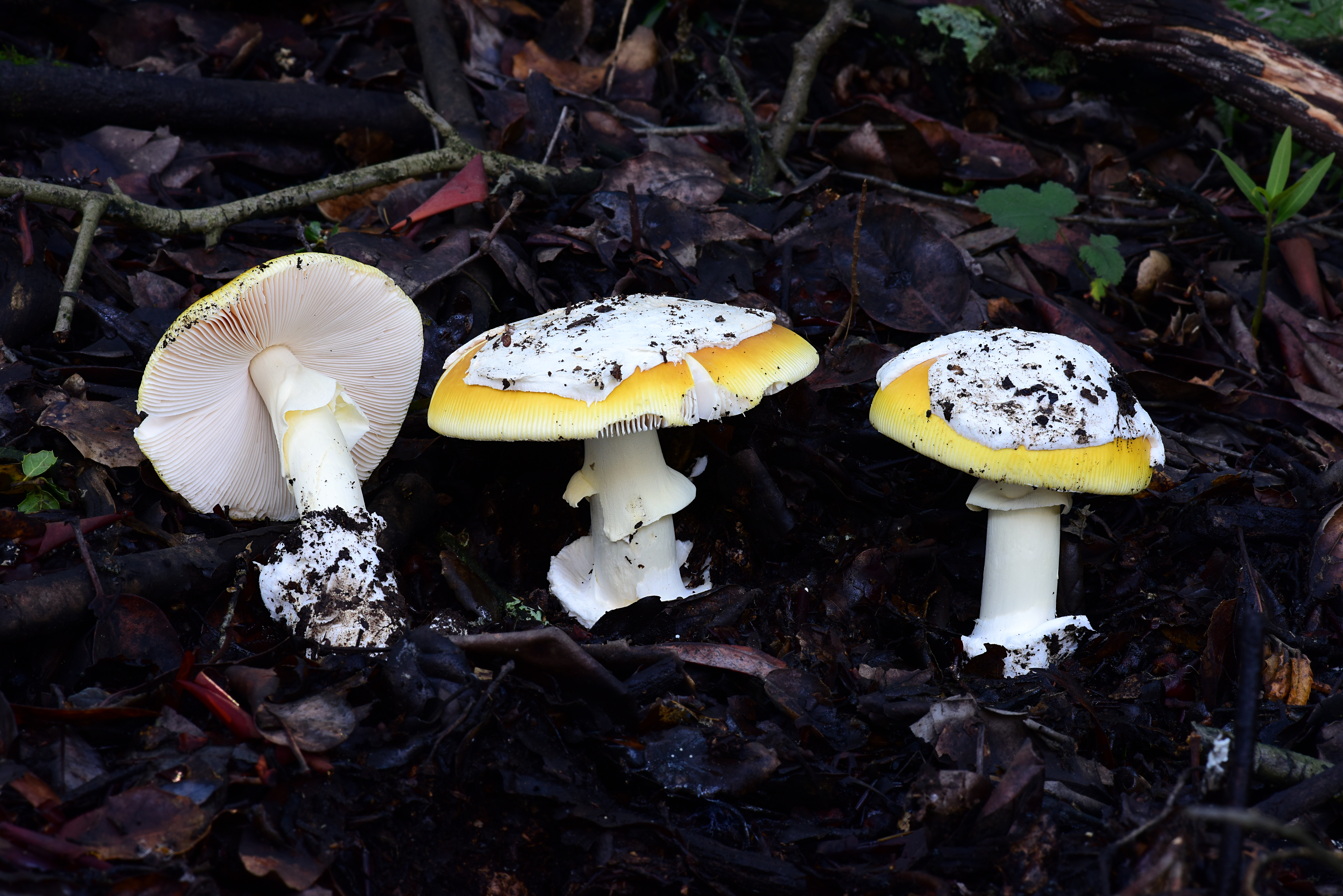
Amanita calyptroderma in Oakland, California

== Edibility ==
Experienced mushroom hunters regard this mushroom as a good edible species, but caution must be exercised when collecting A. calyptroderma for the table, since it can be confused with other species in the genus. Amanita contains some of the deadliest mushrooms in the world, most notably A. phalloides and A. ocreata.

== See also ==
- List of Amanita species
