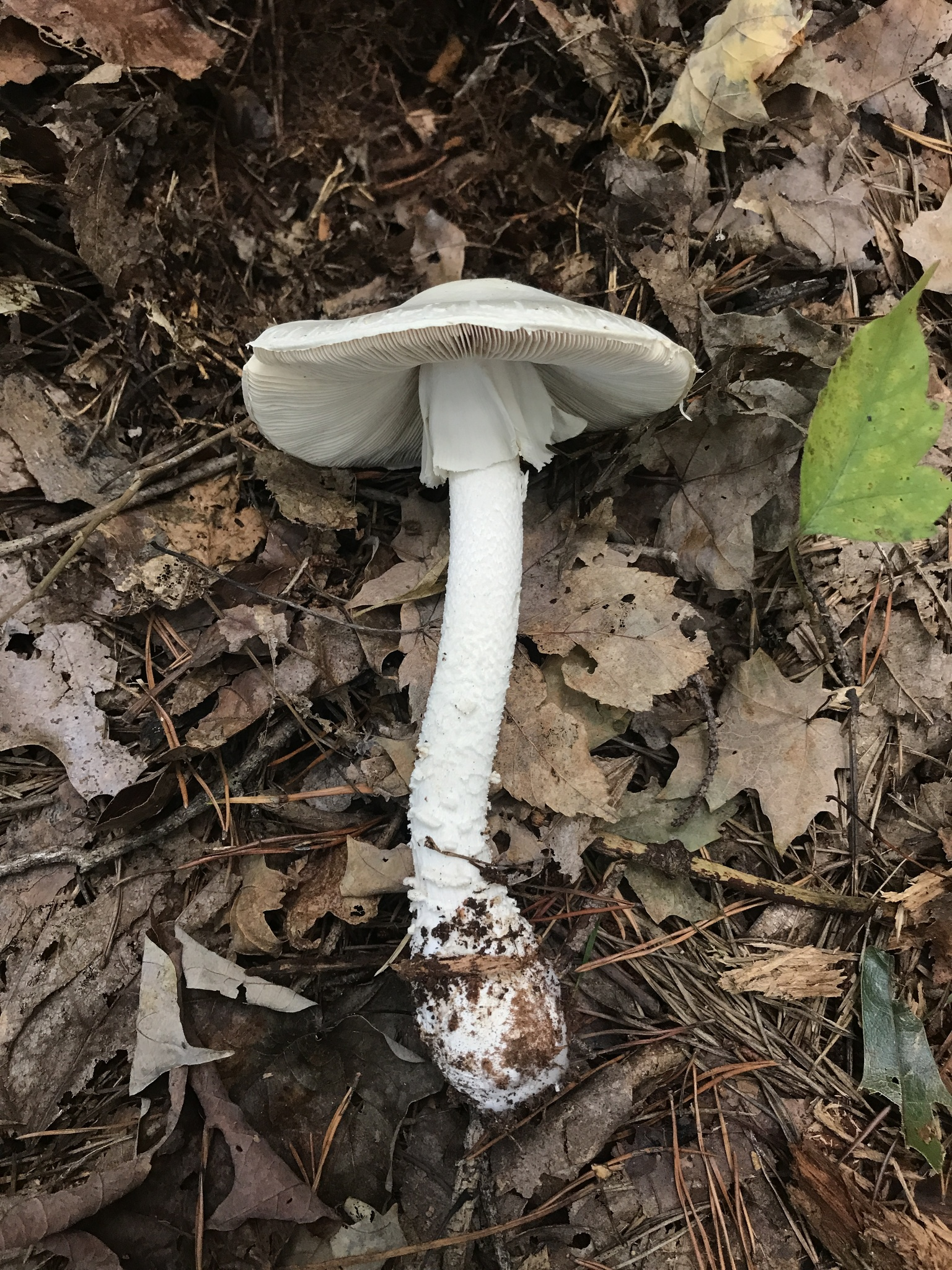

Scientific classification
- Kingdom: Fungi
- Division: Basidiomycota
- Class: Agaricomycetes
- Order: Agaricales
- Family: Amanitaceae
- Genus: Amanita
- Species: A. hygroscopica

Binomial name
- Amanita hygroscopica Coker

= Amanita hygroscopica =

Species of fungus

Amanita hygroscopica
- Mycological characteristics
- Gills on hymenium
- Cap is convex or flat
- Hymenium is free
- Stipe has a ring and volva
- Spore print is white
- Ecology is mycorrhizal
- Edibility is deadly

Amanita hygroscopica (/æməˈnaɪtə /ha͡ɪɡɹəskˈo͡ʊpi͡ə), also known as the pink-gilled destroying angel, is a deadly poisonous fungus, one of many in the genus Amanita.

== Taxonomy ==
The species was first described by William Chambers Coker in 1917.

== Description ==
The cap is 2.5 centimetres (1 inch) wide and hemispheric. The gills are adnate, crowded, medium broad, entire, white, unchanging.

The stem is about 30 by 5–8 millimetres (1 1/8 in × 1/4 in–3/8 in), narrowing upward, smooth, glabrous, white, unchanging when bruised. The ring is fixed 10 mm (3/8 in) from the top of the stem, very short, skirt-like, grooved by the gills above, white, persistent. The bulb is ovoid, white, 20 mm × 15 mm (3/4 in × 5/8 in). The volva is neither appressed nor widely spreading, the edge is either 3-lobed or ragged. The mushroom is odorless and tasteless.

=== Similar species ===
A. hygroscopia resembles several edible species, most notably Agaricus campestris.

== Toxicity ==
The principal toxic constituent is α-Amanitin, an elective inhibitor of RNA polymerase II and III, which causes liver and kidney failure. 15% of those poisoned will die within 10 days and those who survive are at risk of lifelong, permanent liver damage.

There is no antidote for amanitin poisoning; treatment is mainly supportive (gastric lavage, activated carbon, and fluid resuscitation). In severe cases the only effective treatment may be a liver transplant.

Amatoxins, the class of toxins found in these mushrooms, are thermostable: they resist changes due to heat, so their toxic effects are not reduced by cooking.

== See also ==
- List of Amanita species
- List of deadly fungi
