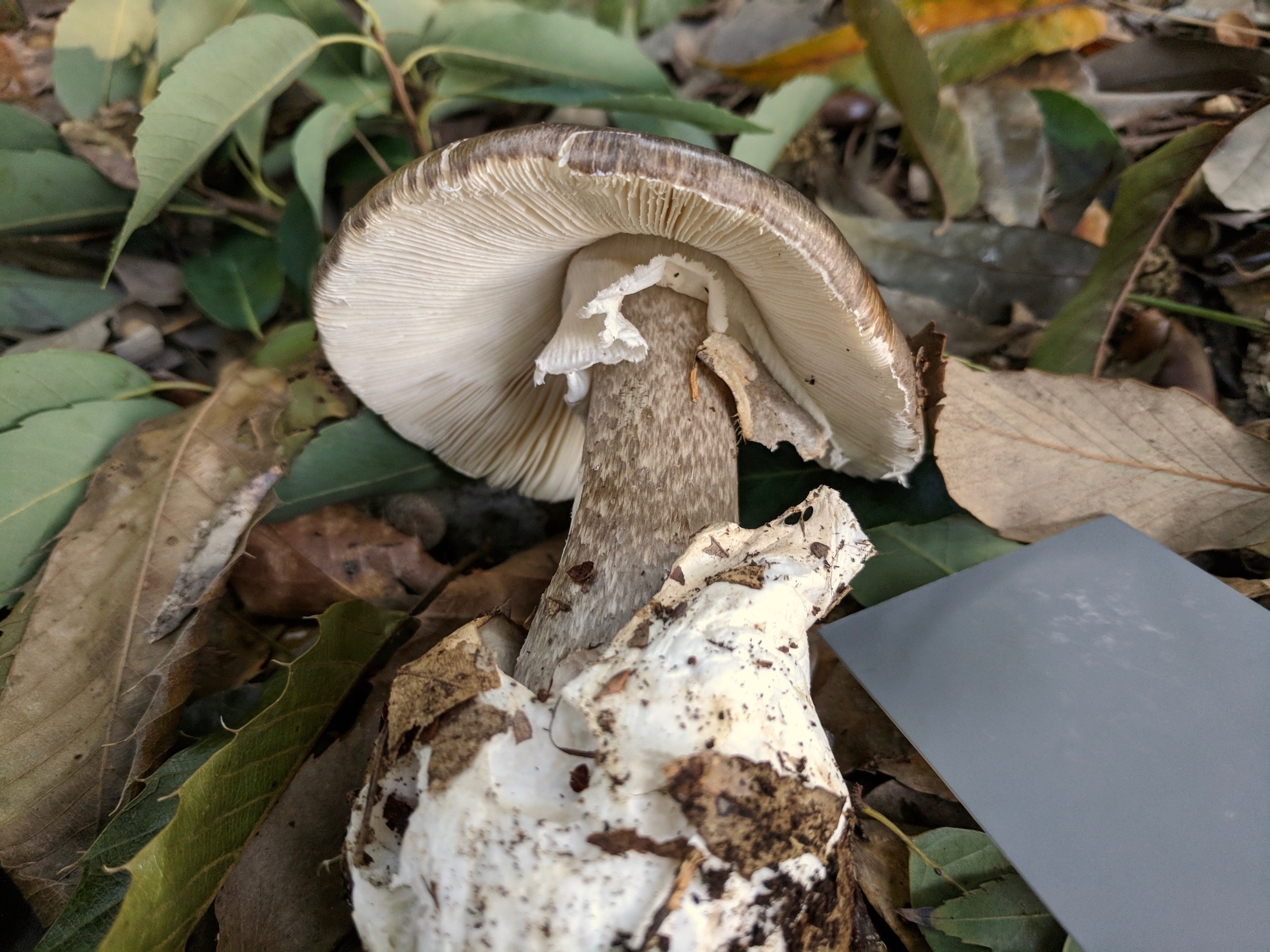
- Amanita fuliginea found growing under mixed woods of hardwoods and pine trees in Tsukuba, Ibaragi, Japan

Scientific classification
- Kingdom: Fungi
- Division: Basidiomycota
- Class: Agaricomycetes
- Order: Agaricales
- Family: Amanitaceae
- Genus: Amanita
- Species: A. fuliginea

Binomial name
- Amanita fuliginea Hongo (1953)

= Amanita fuliginea =

Species of fungus

Amanita fuliginea
- Mycological characteristics
- Gills on hymenium
- Cap is convex
- Hymenium is free
- Stipe has a ring and volva
- Spore print is white
- Ecology is mycorrhizal
- Edibility is deadly

Amanita fuliginea, commonly known as the east Asian brown death cap, is a species of deadly poisonous mushroom in the family Amanitaceae. The fruit bodies have convex, dark gray to blackish caps measuring 3–6 cm (1.2–2.4 in) in diameter. The gills, largely free from attachment to the stipe, are white and have short gills (lamellulae) interspersed. The spores are roughly spherical, amyloid, and typically measure 8–11 by 7–9.5 μm. The species was described as new to science by Japanese mycologist Tsuguo Hongo in 1953. A. fuliginea is classified in Amanita section Phalloideae, which contains the infamous destroying angel.

The mushroom is common in China, where it has caused poisonings. A review of cases in southern China found that between 1994 and 2012, it was responsible for the poisoning of 352 people (of 852 total cases), resulting in 79 deaths (of 183 total). The deadly α and β amanitins have been isolated from this fungus alongside an additional unidentified phallotoxin. Findings indicate that the concentrations of amatoxins and phallotoxins in A. fuliginea vary among its tissues and developmental stages. Toxin levels were found to be highest in the gills, with peak concentrations occurring during the fruiting body's vigorous growth stage.

== See also ==
- List of Amanita species
- List of deadly fungus species
