= Édouard-Jean Gilbert =

French mycologist (1888–1954)

Édouard-Jean Gilbert (1888–1954) was a French mycologist.

He wrote a thesis on the genus Amanita in 1919, and subsequently a monograph on them in 1941.
