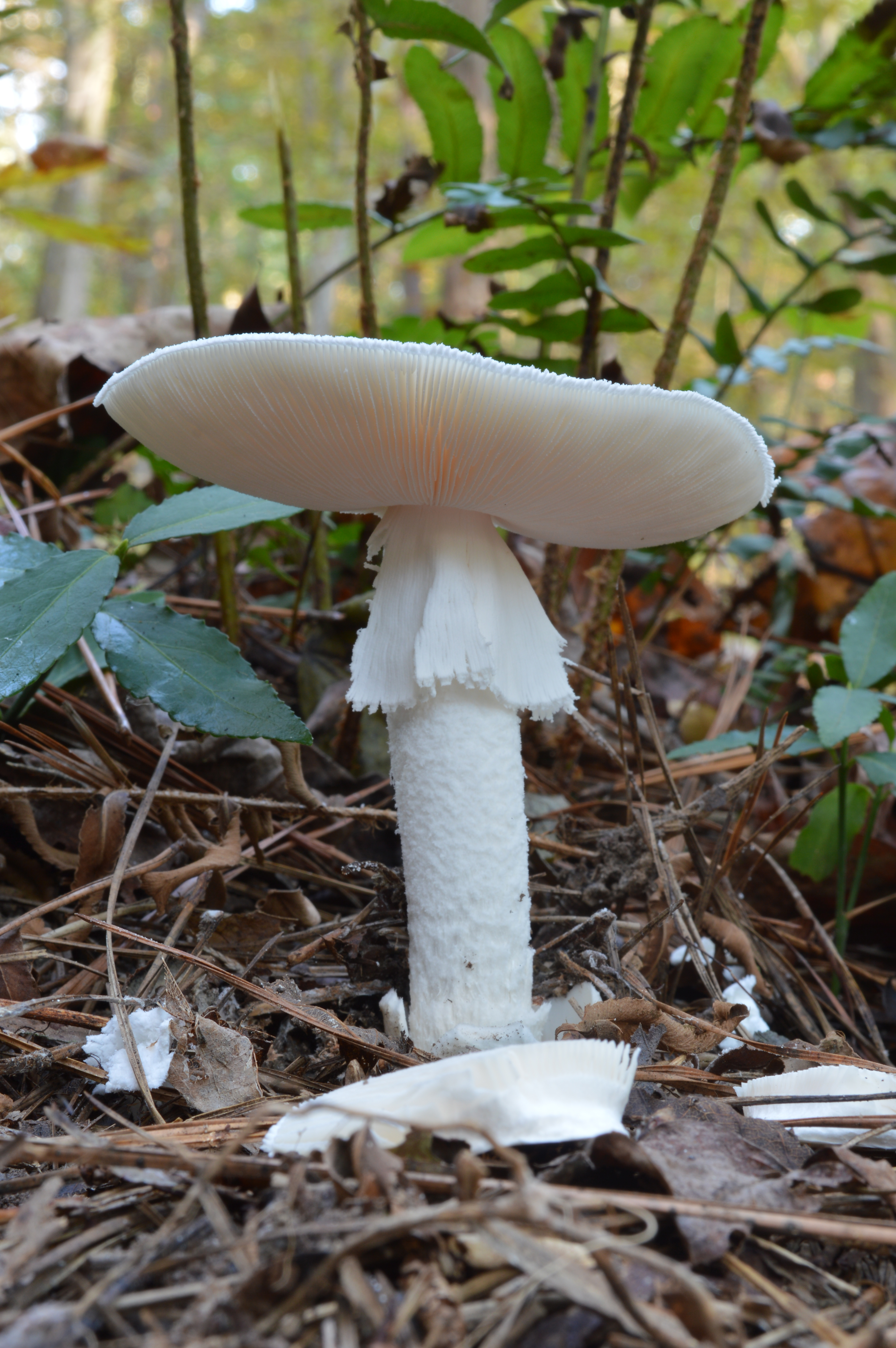

Scientific classification
- Kingdom: Fungi
- Division: Basidiomycota
- Class: Agaricomycetes
- Order: Agaricales
- Family: Amanitaceae
- Genus: Amanita
- Species: A. elliptosperma

Binomial name
- Amanita elliptosperma G. F. Atk.

= Amanita elliptosperma =

Atkinson's Destroying Angel

Species of fungus

Amanita elliptosperma
- Mycological characteristics
- Gills on hymenium
- Cap is convex or flat
- Hymenium is free
- Stipe has a ring and volva
- Spore print is white
- Ecology is mycorrhizal
- Edibility is deadly

Amanita elliptosperma, commonly known as the Atkinson's destroying angel, is a basidiomycete fungus, one of many in the genus Amanita. Although its toxicity is not confirmed, it is assumed to be deadly poisonous like its close relatives. Originally described from North Carolina, it is found in the eastern United States from New England to eastern Texas.

== See also ==
- List of Amanita species
- List of deadly fungi
