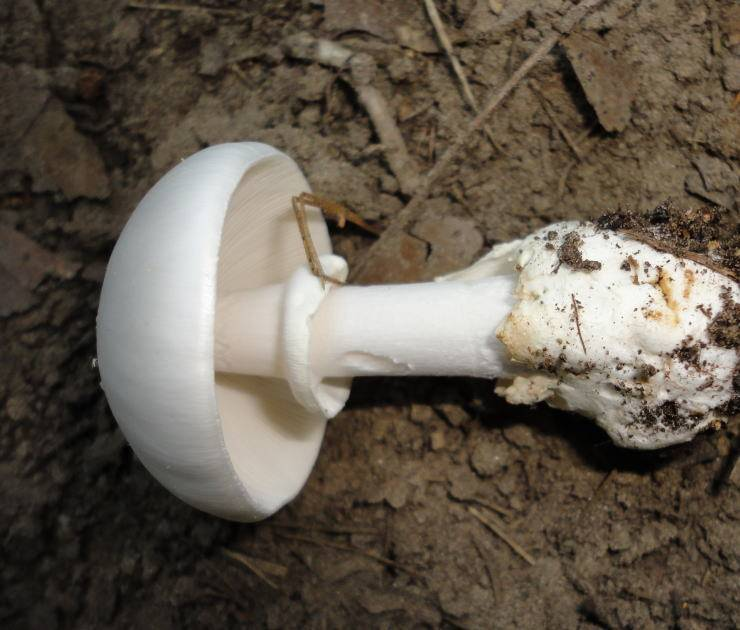

Scientific classification
- Kingdom: Fungi
- Division: Basidiomycota
- Class: Agaricomycetes
- Order: Agaricales
- Family: Amanitaceae
- Genus: Amanita
- Species: A. magnivelaris

Binomial name
- Amanita magnivelaris Peck

= Amanita magnivelaris =

Species of fungus

Amanita magnivelaris
- Mycological characteristics
- Gills on hymenium
- Cap is convex or flat
- Hymenium is free
- Stipe has a ring and volva
- Spore print is white
- Ecology is mycorrhizal
- Edibility is deadly

Amanita magnivelaris, commonly known as the great felt skirt destroying angel, is a highly toxic basidiomycete fungus, one of many in the genus Amanita. Originally described from Ithaca, New York, by Charles Horton Peck, it occurs in southeastern Canada, Wisconsin, New York, and Michigan.

== Description ==
A. magnivelaris is completely white, with its pileus spanning 4–13 centimeters in diameter, and its stipe ranging 7–18 centimeters long. The annulus is thick and felted, while its base is bulbous and encased in a volva.

== Toxicity ==
Containing amatoxins, A. magnivelaris is highly hepatotoxic, and may be deadly if consumed.

== See also ==
- List of Amanita species
- List of deadly fungi
