= Amanita virosiformis =

Narrow-spored destroying angel

Scientific classification
- Kingdom: Fungi
- Division: Basidiomycota
- Class: Agaricomycetes
- Order: Agaricales
- Family: Amanitaceae
- Genus: Amanita
- Species: A. virosiformis

Binomial name
- Amanita virosiformis (Murrill) Murrill

Synonyms
- Amanita tenuifolia (Murrill) Murrill

Species of fungus

Amanita virosiformis
- Mycological characteristics
- Gills on hymenium
- Cap is convex or flat
- Hymenium is free
- Stipe has a ring and volva
- Spore print is white
- Ecology is mycorrhizal
- Edibility is deadly

Amanita virosiformis, commonly known as the narrow-spored destroying angel, is a poisonous basidiomycete fungus. Originally described from Florida, it is found from coastal North Carolina through to eastern Texas in the southeastern United States. It is deadly toxic, containing amatoxins.

== See also ==
- List of Amanita species
- List of deadly fungi
