= Α-Amanitin =

Chemical compound

α-Amanitin
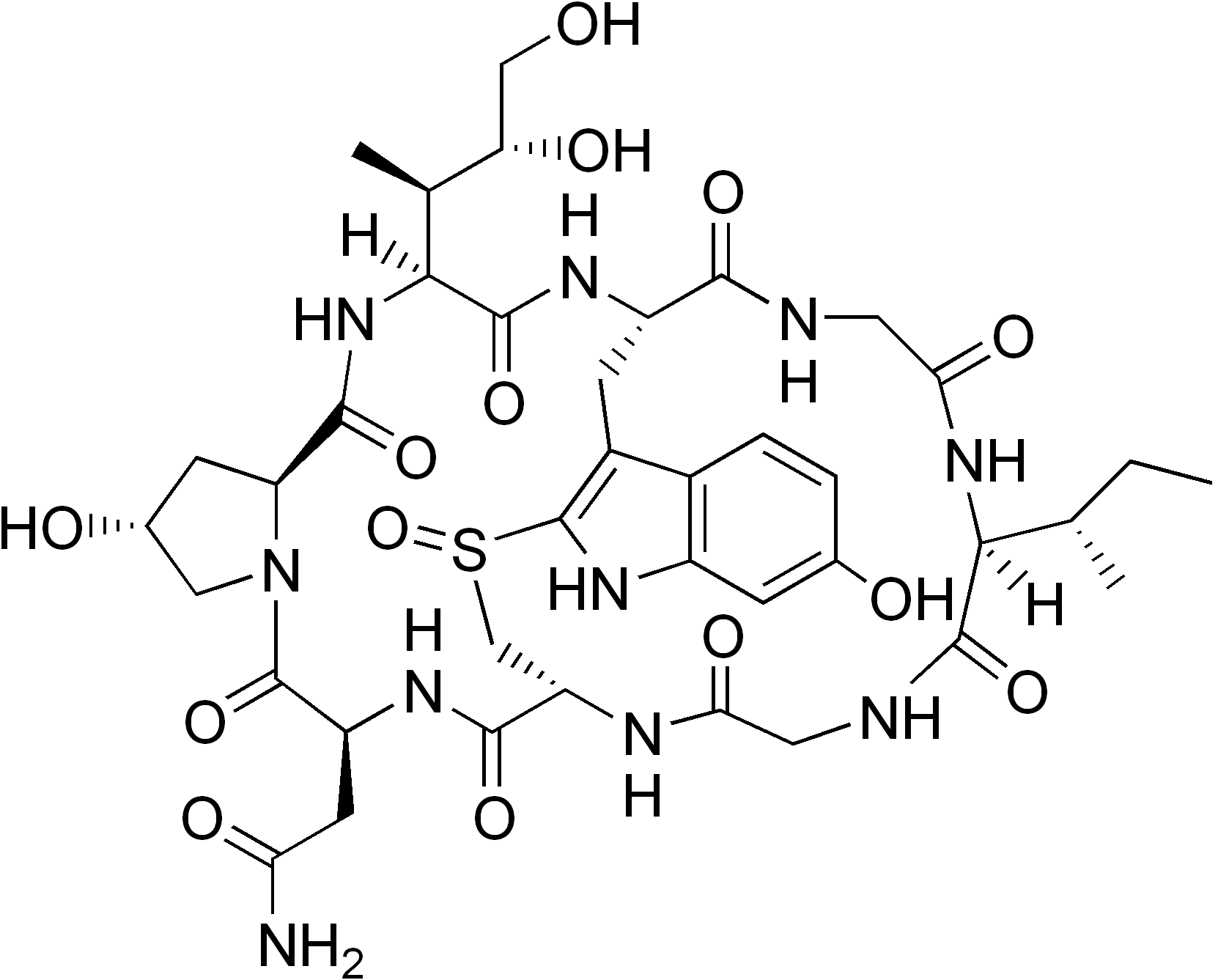

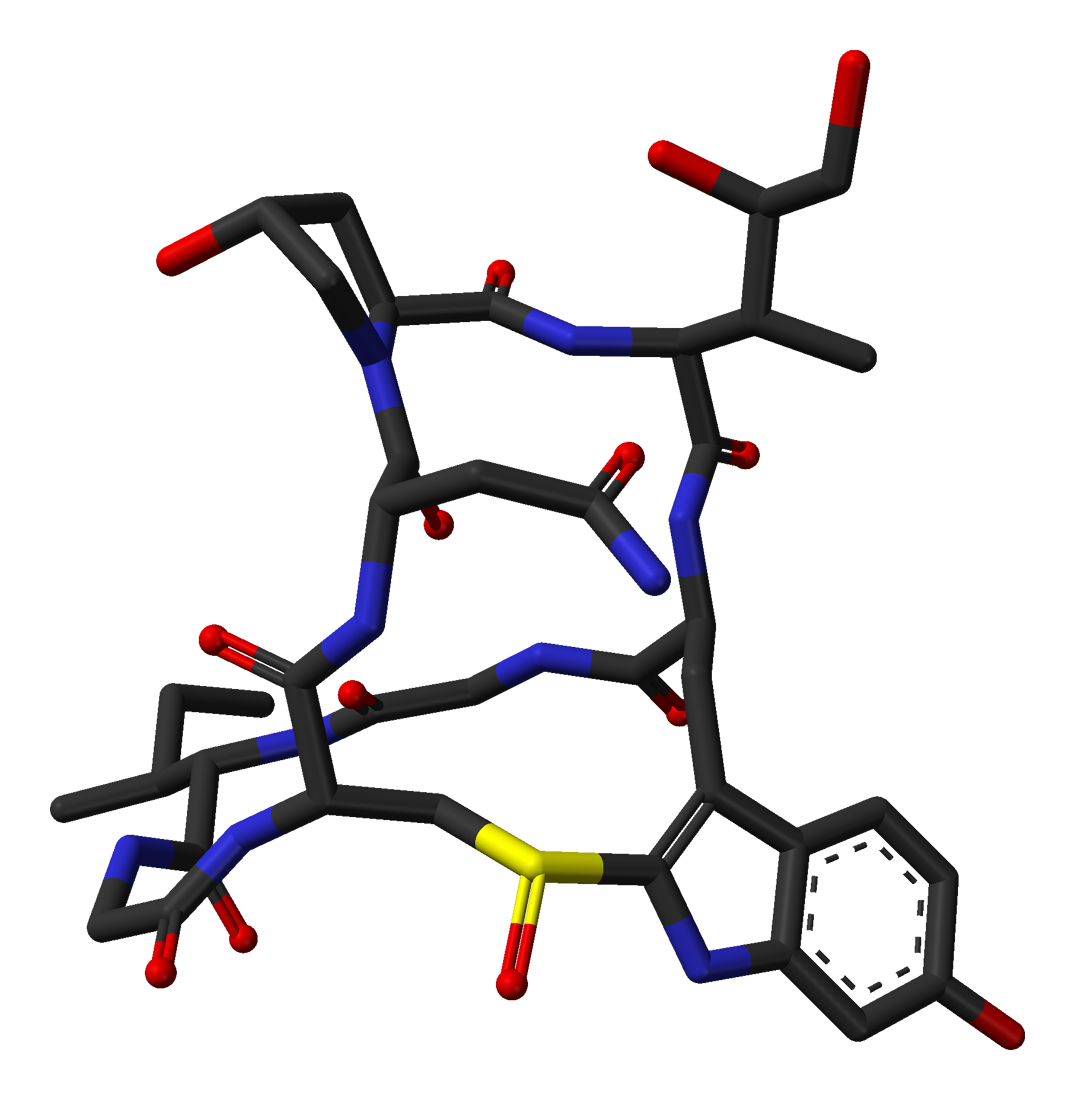

Names
- Other names (cyclic L-asparaginyl-4-hydroxy-L-proly-(R)-4,5-dihydroxy-L-isoleucyl-6-hydroxy-2-mercapto-L-tryptophylglycyl-L-isoleucylglycyl-L-cysteinyl) cyclic (4 → 8)-sulfide(R)-S-oxide.

Identifiers
| CAS Number | 23109-05-9 |
| 3D model (JSmol) | Interactive image |
| ChEBI | CHEBI:37415 |
| ChemSpider | 16735655 |
| ECHA InfoCard | 100.041.287 |
| PubChem CID | 2100 |
| UNII | E04K0QZ999 |
| CompTox Dashboard (EPA) | DTXSID1036709 |
- InChI: InChI=1S/C39H54N10O14S/c1-4-16(2)31-36(60)42-11-29(55)43-25-15-64(63)38-21(20-6-5-18(51)7-22(20)46-38)9-23(33(57)41-12-30(56)47-31)44-37(61)32(17(3)27(53)14-50)48-35(59)26-8-19(52)13-49(26)39(62)24(10-28(40)54)45-34(25)58/h5-7,16-17,19,23-27,31-32,46,50-53H,4,8-15H2,1-3H3,(H2,40,54)(H,41,57)(H,42,60)(H,43,55)(H,44,61)(H,45,58)(H,47,56)(H,48,59)/t16?,17?,19?,23-,24-,25-,26-,27-,31-,32-,64+/m0/s1 Key: CIORWBWIBBPXCG-NUCBJAHASA-N
- SMILES: O=C(NCC(N[C@@](C(NCC(N[C@@H](C3)C(N[C@@H](CC(N)=O)C(N5[C@H]4C[C@@H](O)C5)=O)=O)=O)=O)([H])[C@@H](C)CC)=O)[C@H](CC1=C(S3=O)NC2=C1C=CC(O)=C2)NC([C@@]([C@@H](C)[C@@H](O)CO)([H])N[C@@]4=O)=O

Properties
| Chemical formula | C_{39}H_{54}N_{10}O_{14}S |
| Molar mass | 918.97 g/mol |
| Solubility in water | Good |

Hazards
- Occupational safety and health (OHS/OSH)
| Main hazards | Highly toxic |
- GHS labelling
| Pictograms | (GHS06: Toxic) |
| Hazard statements | H300, H310, H330, H373 |
| Precautionary statements | P260, P262, P264, P270, P271, P280, P284, P301+P310, P302+P350, P304+P340, P310, P314, P320, P321, P330, P361, P363, P403+P233, P405, P501 |
- Except where otherwise noted, data are given for materials in their standard state (at 25 °C [77 °F], 100 kPa). verify (what is ?) Infobox references

α-Amanitin (alpha-Amanitin) is a cyclic peptide of eight amino acids. It is possibly the most deadly of all the amatoxins, toxins found in several species of the mushroom genus Amanita, one being the death cap (Amanita phalloides) as well as the destroying angel, a complex of similar species, principally A. virosa and A. bisporigera. It is also found in the mushrooms Galerina marginata, Lepiota subincarnata and Conocybe rugosa. The oral LD_{50} of amanitin is 100 μg/kg for rats.

Amatoxins are part of the RiPP class of natural products. The fungal genes encoding the proprotein for α-amanitin belong to the same MSDIN protein family as those that encode for the phallotoxins.

== Scientific use ==
α-Amanitin is a selective inhibitor of RNA polymerase II and III but not I. This mechanism makes it a deadly toxin.

α-Amanitin can also be used to determine which types of RNA polymerase are present. This is done by testing the sensitivity of the polymerase in the presence of α-amanitin. RNA polymerase I is insensitive, RNA polymerase II is highly sensitive (inhibited at 1μg/ml), RNA polymerase III is moderately sensitive (inhibited at 10μg/ml), and RNA polymerase IV is slightly sensitive (inhibited at 50μg/ml).

== Chemical structure ==
α-Amanitin is a highly modified bicyclic octapeptide consisting of an outer and an inner loop. The outer loop is formed by peptide bonds between a carboxyl terminus of an amino acid to the subsequent amino terminus of the next residue. The inner loop is closed by an oxidized tryptathionine linkage between 6-hydroxy-tryptophan and cysteine, which is responsible for holding the molecule in the proper conformation for binding to its protein target. In addition, α-amanitin is decorated with modified amino acid side chains (2S,3R,4R)-4,5-dihydroxy-isoleucine, trans-4-hydroxy-proline, which gives its high affinity for RNA polymerase II and III.

== Detection techniques ==
Early methods to detect alpha-amanitin included thin-layer chromatography (TLC). In most solvent systems used in TLC, alpha-amanitin and beta-amanitin would travel at different rates, thus allowing individual identification of each toxin. Another early method was the Meixner test (also known as the Wieland test), which would detect amatoxins, but also yielded false positives for some compounds, such as psilocin. Capillary zone electrophoresis was also developed, but was not adequately sensitive for clinical samples, but sufficient for mushroom extracts.

More recently, the use of high-performance liquid chromatography (HPLC) has become the preferred method, which allows for better resolution, reproducibility, and higher sensitivity. A range of detectors can be paired with HPLC, such as UV or mass spectrometry.

As early as the 1980s, antibody-based assays (immunoassays) were developed for amanitin (but more often recognize amatoxins as the antibodies cross-react with some of the congeners). The earliest immunoassays were radioimmunoassays and then enzyme linked immunosorbent assays (ELISAs). More, recently, in 2020, a monoclonal antibody-based lateral flow immunoassay (similar to a pregnancy test) has been developed that can quickly and selectively detect the toxin in mushroom extracts and in urine samples.

== Biosynthesis ==
α-Amanitin and other amatoxins are synthesized as proproteins on ribosomes and modified by several specialized enzymes. The ribosomally synthesized peptide, called the precursor peptide, is recognized by a Prolyl Oligopeptidase B (POPB) type enzyme. POPB cleaves the precursor peptide and cyclizes the remaining octapeptide. Following cyclization, the peptide is hydroxylated by P450-29 and FMO1 enzymes. The hydroxylations of isoleucine and tryptophan contribute to the high-affinity binding of α-amanitin to RNA polymerase II.

The biosynthetic pathway for the unique tryptophan-sulfoxide bridge is still poorly understood

== Total synthesis ==
Matinkhoo et al. devised strategies to surmount three synthetic hurdles to give α-amanitin in 2018. First, enantioselective synthesis of solid phase peptide synthesis-compatible (2S,3R,4R)-4,5-dihydroxyisoleucine was afforded in 11 steps from 2-(benzyloxy)acetaldehyde. Two key stereochemistry-defining steps include Brown crotylation at (3R,4R)-positions, and asymmetric Strecker amino acid synthesis at the (2S)-α carbon. Secondly, chemoselective inner ring closure by fluorocyclization between 6-hydroxytrytophan and cysteine was achieved by intra-annular Savige-Fontana reaction. This requires a solid phase peptide synthesis-compatible, and methyliminodiacetic acid (MIDA), a boron protecting group, orthogonal amino acid in 5 steps. As a final step, enantioselective oxidation at the tryptathionine linkage was achieved using a bulky organic oxidizing agent and an optimized solvent system to afford the desired bio-reactive (R)-enantiomer sulfoxide, completing the total synthesis.

== Symptoms of poisoning ==
α-Amanitin has an unusually strong and specific attraction to the enzyme RNA polymerase II. Upon ingestion and uptake by liver cells, it binds to the RNA polymerase II enzyme, effectively causing cytolysis of hepatocytes (liver cells). Few effects are reported within 10 hours; it is not unusual for significant effects to take as long as 24 hours after ingestion to appear, with this delay in symptoms making α-amanitin poisoning even more difficult to diagnose and all the more dangerous. By then, it is far past the time in which stomach pumping would yield an efficient result. Diarrhea and cramps are the first symptoms, but those pass, giving a false sign of remission. Typically, on the 4th to 5th day, the toxin starts to have severe effects on the liver and kidneys, leading to total system failure in both. Death usually takes place around a week from ingestion.

Around 15% of those poisoned will die within 10 days, progressing through a comatose stage to kidney failure, liver failure, hepatic coma, respiratory failure and death. Those who recover are at risk of permanent liver damage. Diagnosis is difficult, and is established by observation of the clinical symptoms as well as the presence of α-amanitin in the urine. Urine screening is generally most useful within 48 hours of ingestion. Treatment is mainly supportive (gastric lavage, activated carbon, fluid resuscitation) but includes various drugs to counter the amatoxins, including intravenous penicillin and cephalosporin derivatives, and, in cases of greater ingestion, can extend to an orthotopic liver transplant. The most reliable method to treat amanitin poisoning is through gastric lavage immediately after ingestion; however, the onset of symptoms is generally too late for this to be an option. Chemically modified silibinin, silibinin dihydrogen disuccinate disodium (trade name Legalon SIL) a solution for IV administration, is used in treatment of severe intoxication with hepatotoxic substances such as paracetamol and amanitins.

== Mode of inhibitory action ==
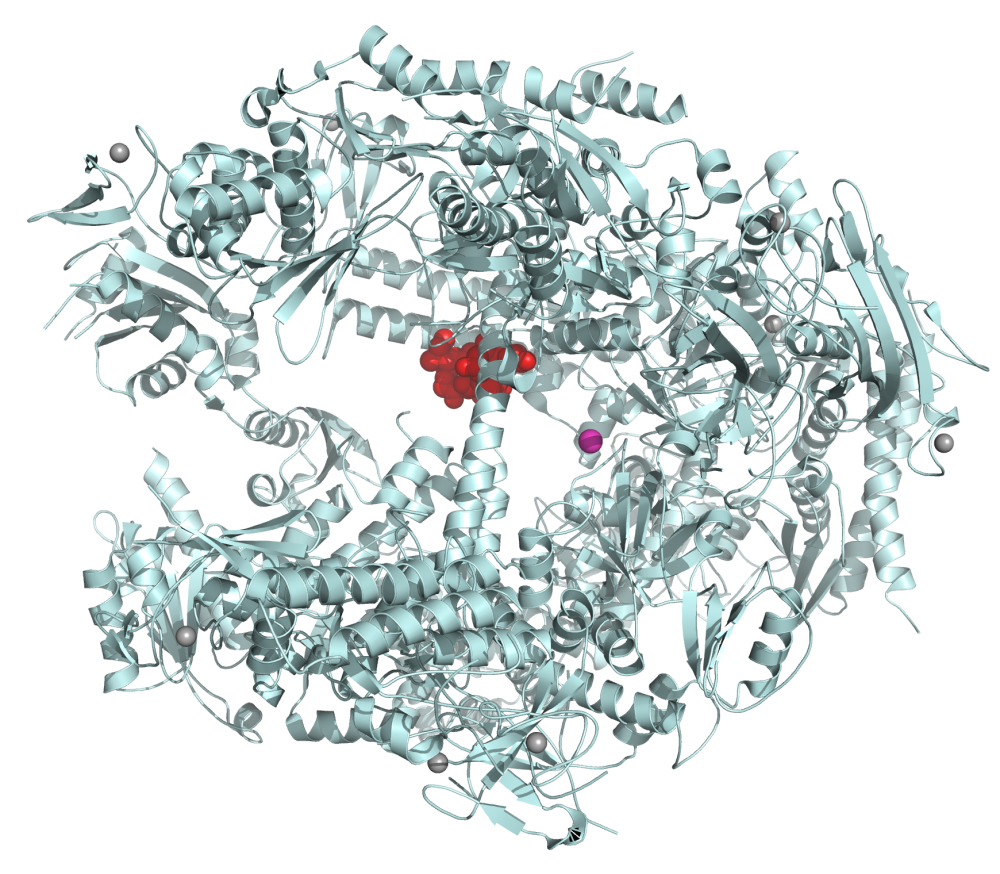
α-Amanitin (red) bound to RNA polymerase II from Saccharomyces cerevisiae (brewer's yeast). From PDB: 1K83.

Based on a 2002 crystal structure analysis, α-amanitin interacts with the bridge helix in RNA polymerase II (pol II). This interaction interferes with the translocation of RNA and DNA needed to empty the site for the next round of RNA synthesis. The addition of α-amanitin can reduce the rate of pol II translocating on DNA from several thousand to a few nucleotides per minute, but has little effect on the affinity of pol II for nucleoside triphosphate, and a phosphodiester bond can still be formed. The bridge helix has evolved to be flexible and its movement is required for translocation of the polymerase along the DNA backbone. Binding of α-amanitin puts a constraint on its mobility, hence slowing down the translocation of the polymerase and the rate of synthesis of the RNA molecule.

== Use in antibody-drug conjugates ==
A new antibody-drug conjugate (ADC) technology based on α-amanitin has shown activity in therapy-resistant tumor cells, e.g. cells expressing multi-drug resistant transporters, tumor-initiating cells and non-dividing cells at picomolar concentrations.

The unique mode of action of α-amanitin seems to make the amanitin-based ADCs a suitable toxic payload. This toxin has a water-soluble structure, resulting in ADCs with low tendency for aggregation.

Significant clinical advances occurred in 2025 and 2026 with Heidelberg Pharma’s lead candidate HDP-101 (pamlectabart tismanitin), a BCMA-targeted amanitin-based antibody-drug conjugate (ATAC) for relapsed or refractory multiple myeloma. In the ongoing Phase I/IIa trial (NCT04879043), dose escalation proceeded safely up to 218 µg/kg without reaching a maximum tolerated dose, and the recommended Phase IIa dose was selected in April 2026. The program received FDA Fast Track designation in October 2025. In the higher-dose cohorts (90–140 µg/kg), overall response rates reached 38–57 %, with several heavily pretreated patients, including those who had failed prior BCMA-directed therapies, achieving stringent complete remissions lasting more than one year. The safety profile remained favorable, with mostly mild-to-moderate and manageable adverse events and no clinically significant hepatotoxicity, ocular toxicity, or renal impairment. These results highlight the clinical translation of α-amanitin’s cell-cycle-independent mechanism, which effectively targets both proliferating tumor cells and quiescent cancer stem cells. The ATAC platform is also advancing into solid tumors. TROP2-targeted conjugates based on the hRS7 antibody achieved complete tumor eradication in patient-derived xenograft models of pancreatic cancer and triple-negative breast cancer, outperforming the approved ADC sacituzumab govitecan. In January 2026, Takeda initiated a Phase I/II clinical trial of an ATAC candidate for solid tumors.

== See also ==
- Mushroom poisoning
- Antibody-drug conjugate
