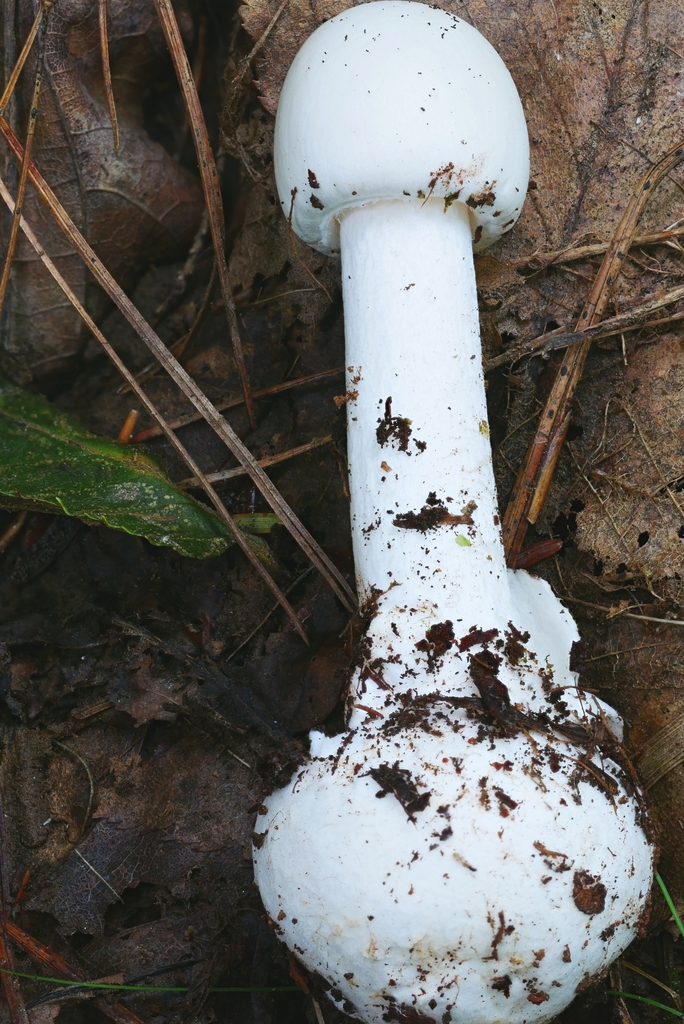

Scientific classification
- Kingdom: Fungi
- Division: Basidiomycota
- Class: Agaricomycetes
- Order: Agaricales
- Family: Amanitaceae
- Genus: Amanita
- Species: A. amerivirosa

Binomial name
- Amanita amerivirosa Tulloss (2021a)

Synonyms
- Amanita virosa var. levipes Neville & Poumarat (2004)

= Amanita amerivirosa =

Species of fungus

Amanita amerivirosa
- Mycological characteristics
- Gills on hymenium
- Cap is convex or flat
- Hymenium is free
- Stipe has a ring and volva
- Spore print is white
- Ecology is mycorrhizal
- Edibility is deadly

Amanita amerivirosa is an agaric species of fungus in genus Amanita. It is poisonous, containing deadly amatoxins. It is commonly referred to as the North American destroying angel, and is one of the many species in Amanita section Phalloideae that is considered a destroying angel.

== Description ==
Amanita amerivirosa has a smooth, white pileus that may range from 5 to 13 centimeters across. The stipe may reach a height of 15 centimeters, and the base will always be bulbous and encased in a saccate volva. It has a persistent, membranous annulus on its stipe which resembles a skirt.

Its gills are crowded, white, and may be free to adnate. Its spores differ in size and shape from most other destroying angels, being approximately 9-11 microns long, and 8-10 microns wide. They are amyloid and roughly spheroid in shape, typically being larger and more spherical than other species of destroying angels. However, the spores of A. amerivirosa are generally insufficient for distinguishing it from certain species like A. helmettensis.

== Distribution ==
Amanita amerivirosa is generally found in woodlands, occurring in eastern North America and ranging from the northern part of the Gulf of Mexico to Newfoundland, Canada, and Quebec. Furthermore, the species has been introduced to the Mediterranean, being prevalent in France.

== Toxicity ==
As with many species in A. section Phalloideae, A. amerivirosa contains both phallotoxins and amatoxins. In particular, amatoxins inhibit RNA polyamerase II, which is responsible for the transcription of mRNA. This inhibition leads to a halting of protein synthesis, which leads to cell death. Due to their need for an exceptionally high rate of metabolic turnover, hepatocytes are especially affected, with cases of amatoxin poisoning often causing severe and sometimes fatal liver damage.
