= Phallolysin =

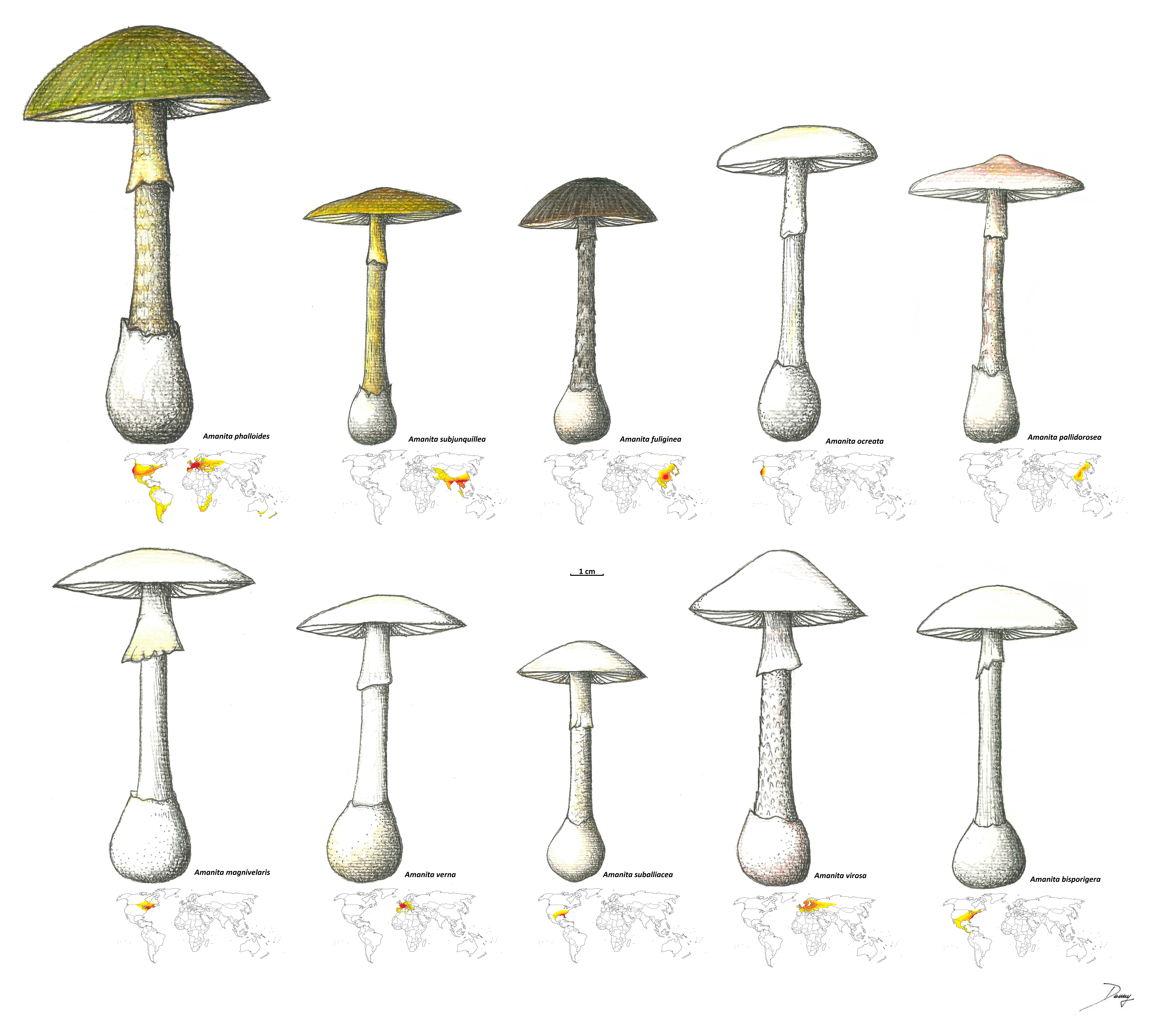
This image depicts the various types of mushrooms within the Amanita genus. Phallolysin is most commonly found in the Amanita phalloides species.

Phallolysin is a protein found the Amanita phalloides species of the Amanita genus of mushrooms, the species commonly known as the death cap mushroom. The protein is toxic and causes cytolysis in many cells found in animals and is noted for its hemolytic properties. It was one of the first toxins discovered in Amanita phalloides when the various toxins in the species where first being researched. The protein itself is observed to come in 3 variations, with observed differences in isoelectric point. Cytolysis can be best described as being the destruction of cells, likely due to exposure from an external source such as pathogens and toxins. Hemolysis then follows a similar destructive pathway, but instead focuses specifically on the destruction of red blood cells. Phallolysin is known to be thermolabile, meaning that it is destroyed at high temperatures, and acid labile, meaning that it is easily broken down in acidic environments.

== History ==
The toxic properties of death cap mushrooms have been known for most of recorded history, with historical accounts implicating it in the deaths of emperors. Attempts to isolate the toxic compounds began in the late 19th century, with the cytolytic elements of A. phalloides being isolated in 1891. It has been thought that the Roman Emperor Claudius, in 54 AD, and the Holy Roman Emperor Charles VI, in 1740, were some of the earliest victims of death cap poisoning. Due to this, the death cap mushroom has gained the nickname the ‘killer of kings.’ The beginning of this research into the hemolytic properties of the Amanita phalloides, or the Death Cap Mushroom, began with Eduard Rudolf Kobert in 1891, who originally denoted it ‘phallin,’ and was continued by John Jacob Abel and William Webber Ford in 1908. These mushrooms have been attributed to greater than 90% of all cases of mushroom poisoning, in which no active treatment of intoxication cases currently exists. This toxin targets mainly the liver, but may also impact the kidneys and central nervous system as well. As a result of the hemolytic and cytolytic properties, this toxin has been considered for anti-tumor treatments in the early 1970s, where the osmotic lysis of cell membranes was hoped to treat the uncontrollable cell division that tumor cells are notorious for. However, in addition to the non-specificity of the toxin, these trials resulted in the development of an increased potassium concentration in the bloodstream due to the extreme intravascular hemolysis and cytolysis of multiple cell types. Due to the discovery of these lethal side effects, this antitumor treatment route was halted to make room for more sophisticated treatment strategies.

== Physical properties ==
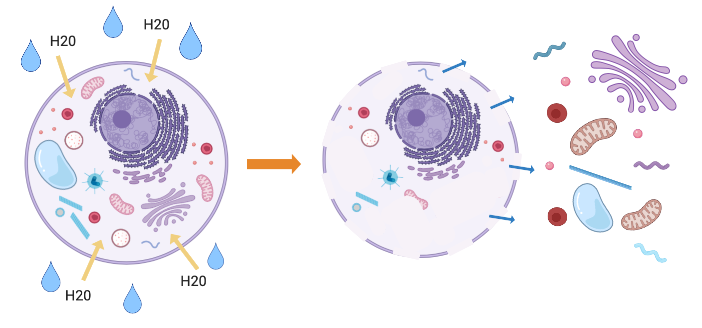
Image depicting the basis of cytolysis, in which an external factor causes an influx of water causing the volume of the cell to exceed the allowed capacity, further causing it to rupture, or lyse, and expel the internal cellular components.

Phallolysin has three variations, which differ in observed isoelectric point. The variations have differences in the amino acids that make up the protein structure, with identical amounts of some amino acids while varying in others. They have near identical molecular weights of 34 kDa. This protein has been found to be relatively stable in alkaline solutions. The structure of this toxin is a combination of two to three cytolytic proteins. Two of the three proteins have been found to be composed of amino acids with high solubility in water, and each containing one tryptophan residue. This protein is composed of roughly 25% neutral sugars such as galactose, glucose, and mannose, but lack amino sugars. Although they are inactivated by temperatures above 65 °C and acidic environments, they are able to remain stable when coming in contact with proteases or glycosidic enzymes. Such proteases range from pepsin, trypsin, alpha-chymotrypsin, subtilisin, pronase E, bromelin, proteinase K, alpha-amylase, and pancreatin. The cytolytic properties of phallolysin are able to be attributed by the capability for the toxin to produce protrusions on the plasma membrane, and further rupture these protrusions, resulting in the formation of transmembrane ion channels in the cell membrane lipid bilayers. These openings then allow for water to diffuse into the cell at a rate that the cell is unable to withstand, further destroying the cell via cytolysis, or osmotic lysis. Each of the three types of phallolysin are denoted as being phallolysin A, B, and C. Phallolysin A maintains an isoelectric point of 8.1, phallolysin B maintains an isoelectric point range of 7.5 - 7.6, and phallolysin C maintains an isoelectric point of 7.0. This protein functions best within a weakly acidic environment, as a result of being denatured by more acidic environments. Temperatures of 65 °C sustained for roughly 30 minutes have the ability to destroy the toxin's hemolytic capabilities.

== Effects on animal cells ==
Phallolysin has been observed to have hemolytic properties toward a variety of animal cells, with it primarily being observed in mammals. The toxic effects are reduced at higher temperatures. These properties are believed to be instigated by ion permeable membrane channels that form as a result of the hemolytic capabilities of phallolysin. In addition to hemolysis, phallolysin in high concentrations are also thought to cause damage to bovine phospholipids with a negative net charge, phosphatidylcholine, and sphingomyelin containing liposomes. However, phospholipid-membranes are only susceptible to phallolysin without receptor proteins being present. These effects are similar to those of staphylococcal 𝛼-toxin. Cytolysis can go into effect at concentrations beginning at 10-8 M, with a lag time of roughly only 2 to 3 minutes. This is accompanied by the rapid movement of Na+ ions into the cell, and the rapid movement of K+ ions out of the cell. This rapid rate of cytolysis occurs primarily in human erythrocytes, or human red blood cells, due to the presence of glycoproteins or glycolipids that act as specific receptors. This interaction further backs up the claim in which phallolysin does not target the cell's plasma membrane, but rather the glycoprotein receptors. This protein has also been known to increase levels of cellular phospholipase, which is a lipolytic enzyme that functions as a phospholipid hydrolyzer to break ester bonds in phospholipids. This has been discovered in the specific cellular phospholipase A_{2} in 3T3 Swiss mouse fibroblasts, which are key components in the structural formation of connective tissues. This study suggests that phallolysin additionally acts by hydrolyzing membrane phospholipids in fibroblasts. Such results also suggest that these cell surfaces in which phallolysin acts upon are also Ca^{2+} enzyme dependent, however the protein itself is not Ca^{2+} dependent. Phallolysin has additionally been discovered to interact mostly with D-galactose and the 𝛽-derivatives, with no glycosylation preferences between O-glycosylation and N-glycosylation. When performing studies on the treatment of rat mast cells with multiple fungal cytolysins, phallolysin was found to interact greatly with lecithin, a fatty substance found in the mice's tissue. It was also found to cause degranulation, or the release of histamine, of the mast cells, depending on the dosage. Various mammals were additionally tested to determine the sensitivity of red blood cells to this toxin. From this, it was determined that mice are more sensitive than rabbits, and rabbits and guinea pigs are roughly equal in sensitivity. Rabbits and guinea pigs are more sensitive than rats, rats are more sensitive than humans, humans are more sensitive than dogs and pigs, and dogs and pigs are more sensitive than sheep and cattle. This is further displayed in the order: mouse > rabbit = guinea pig > rat > man > dog ≃ pig > sheep-cattle.

== See also ==
- Amanita phalloides
- Amanita
- Hemolysis
- Phallotoxin
- Amatoxin
- Virotoxins
- Phalloidin
- Antamanide
