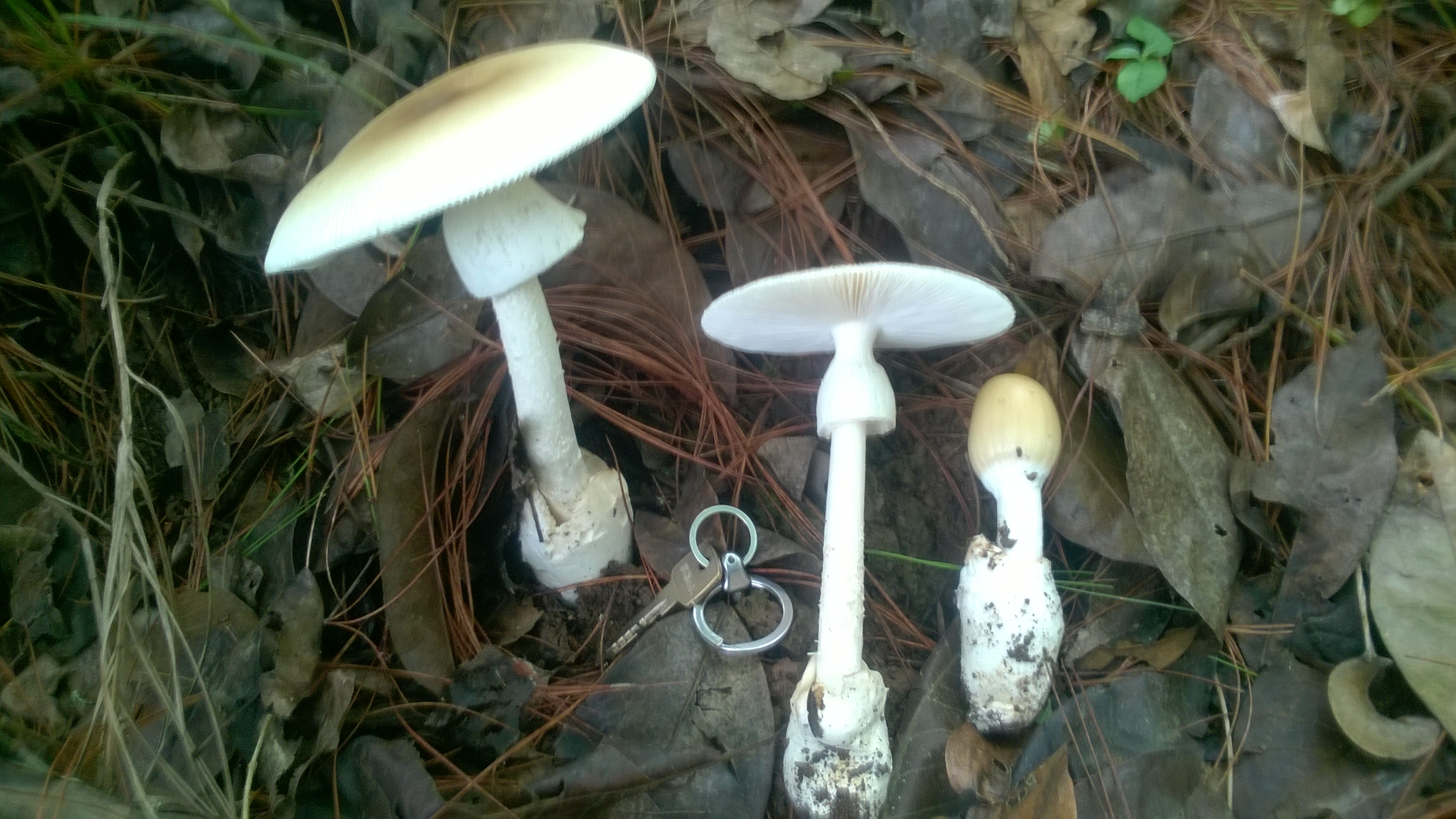
- In Laos

Scientific classification
- Kingdom: Fungi
- Division: Basidiomycota
- Class: Agaricomycetes
- Order: Agaricales
- Family: Amanitaceae
- Genus: Amanita
- Species: A. princeps

Binomial name
- Amanita princeps Corner & Bas (1962)

= Amanita princeps =

Species of fungus

Amanita princeps
- Mycological characteristics
- Gills on hymenium
- Cap is convex or flat
- Hymenium is free
- Stipe has a ring and volva
- Spore print is white
- Ecology is mycorrhizal
- Edibility is choice but not recommended

Amanita princeps, the head man slender Caesar, is a species of agaric fungus in the genus Amanita. It is found in tropical China, Southeast Asia, and the Malay Peninsula down to Singapore. It is edible, and is collected in the wild and sold in local markets. Many incidents of mushroom poisoning have occurred among Laotian and Hmong immigrants to North America, since it is easily confused with Amanita phalloides, the death cap, in both appearance and odor.

Despite its distribution spanning all across continental Southeast Asia, it is not commonly known culinarily, with the Hmong, Yi, & the Laotians being the only documented groups to consume this species. It usually grows during the rainy season; June-August, & is considered a choice mushroom by many. It is also very commonly eaten in Yunnan, along with other mushroom species, especially those of the Phallus genus. The mushroom's cap can have a variety of colours, ranging from white, beige, ochre, olive; similar to that of Amanita phalloides, & brown. The cap can also sometimes have a red or brown tinge on the center, where it is sometimes umbonate. The color of the cap can also sometimes be referred to as "a light biscuit color". It was first discovered by E. J. H. Corner in 1930, with the type locality found in Bukit Timah, Singapore, despite being known by various ethnic groups like the Hmong & Yi long before.

The mushroom is not recommended for consumption due to its similarity to many other Amanita species, including deadly poisonous ones, like Amanita phalloides, Amanita pseudoprinceps; which has an unknown edibility, and Amanita subjunquillea; the East Asian death cap. One of the main features of this Amanita that somewhat sets it apart from poisonous species is the possession of striations lining the margin of its cap, like the grisettes; hence its common name being the "Head man slender Caesar".

Not much is known about this species due to limited researching on this mushroom's traits & habitat.

== Gallery ==
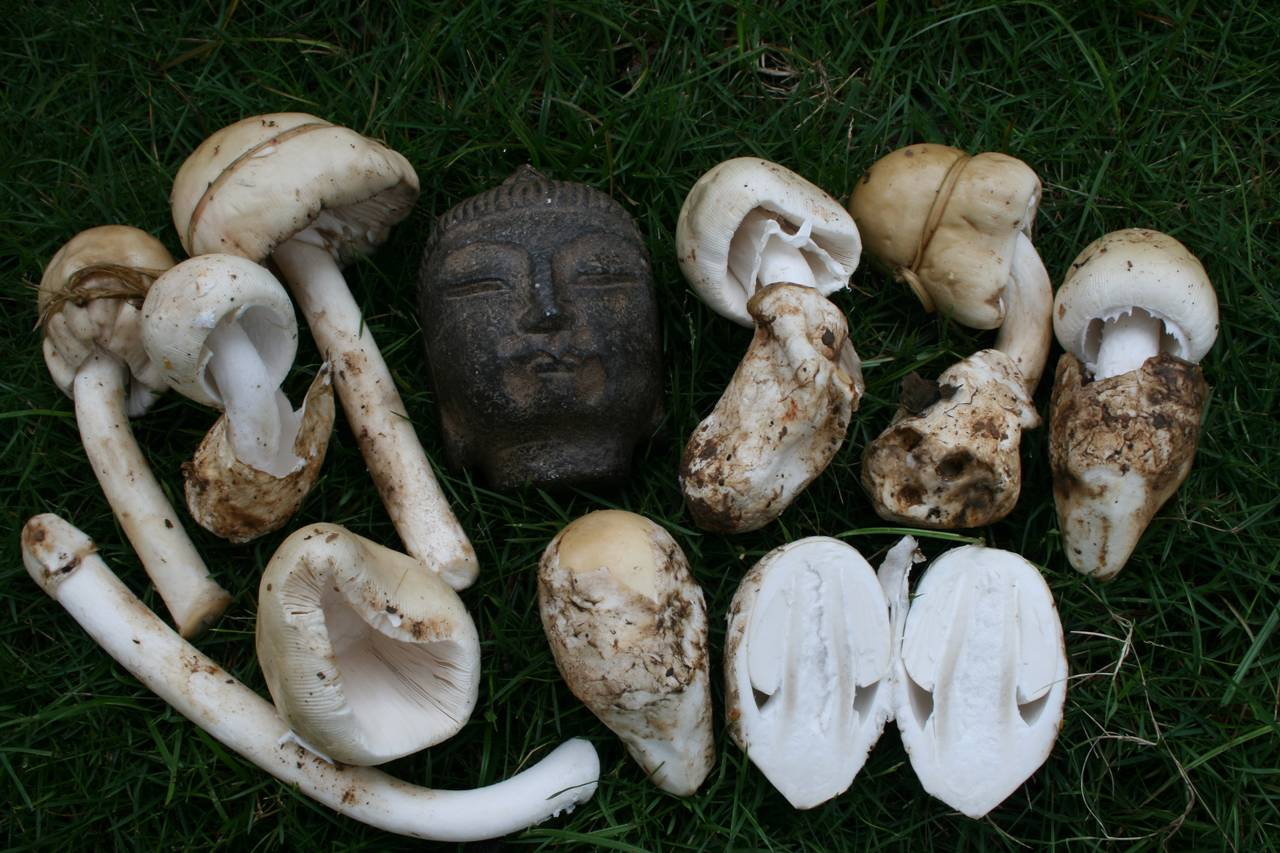
Various specimens, some cut open, with stem and caps, size comparison.

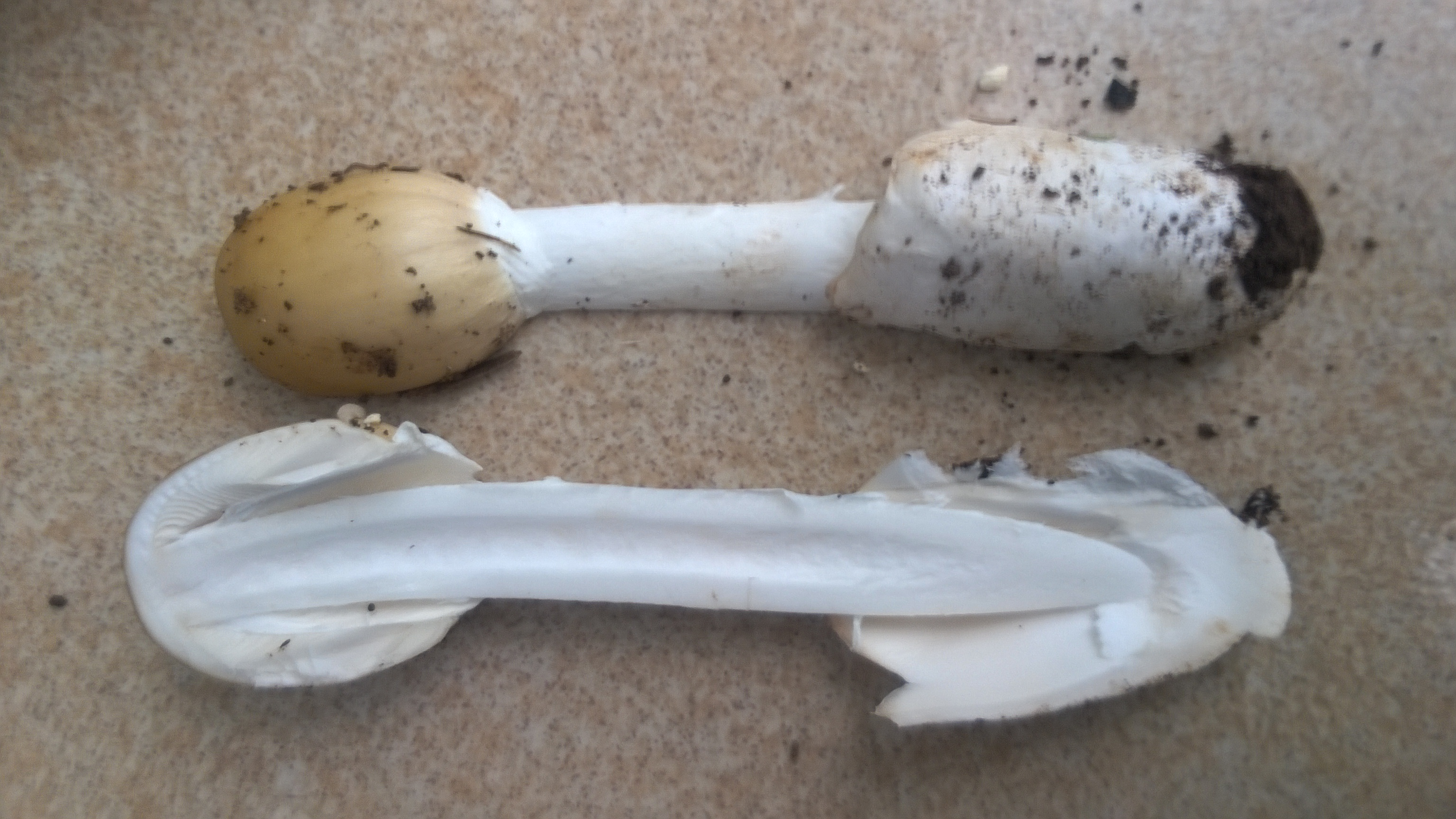
A specimen with a "light biscuit" colored cap, cut in half.

== See also ==
- List of Amanita species
- Amanita subjunquillea
- Amanita hemibapha
