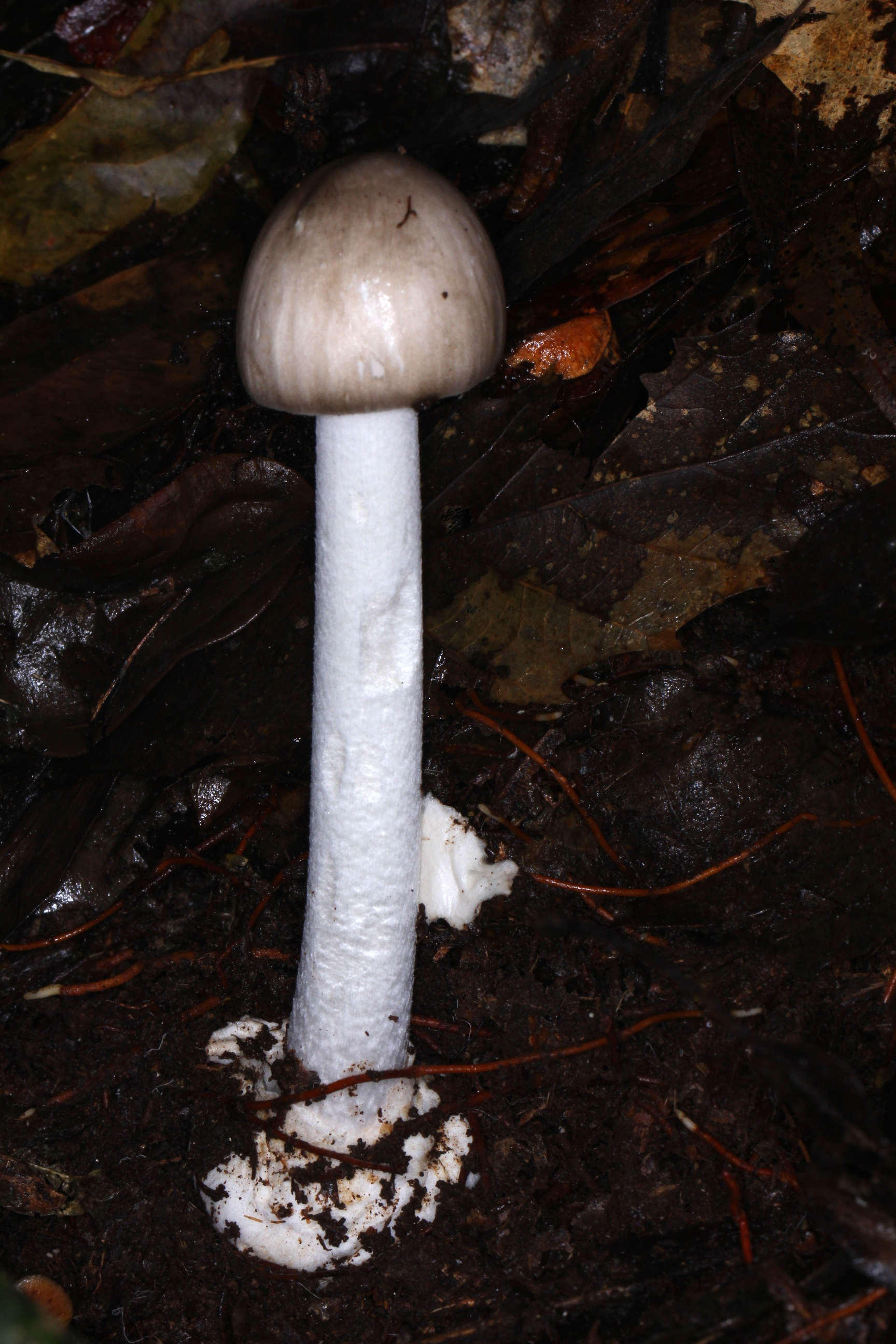

Scientific classification
- Kingdom: Fungi
- Division: Basidiomycota
- Class: Agaricomycetes
- Order: Agaricales
- Family: Amanitaceae
- Genus: Amanita
- Species: A. arocheae

Binomial name
- Amanita arocheae Tulloss, Ovrebo & Halling (1992)

= Amanita arocheae =

Latin American death cap

Species of fungus

Amanita arocheae
- Mycological characteristics
- Gills on hymenium
- Cap is convex
- Hymenium is free
- Stipe has a ring and volva
- Spore print is white
- Ecology is mycorrhizal
- Edibility is deadly

Amanita arocheae, also known as the Latin American death cap, is a mushroom of the large genus Amanita, which occurs in Colombia, Central America and South America. Deadly poisonous, it is a member of Amanita sect. Phalloideae and related to the death cap, A. phalloides.

== Description ==
The cap is convex to plano-convex, reaching dimensions of 3–11 centimetres (1 1/4–4 1/4 inches). The cap surface is sticky or tacky. The center of the cap is gray to brown with a gray edge. The white gills are closely crowded together and free from attachment to the stipe. In young mushrooms, the gills exude drops of clear fluid. The dry, white to pale grey stipe measures 8–20 cm (3–8 in) long by 0.5–1.7 cm (1/4–3/4 in) thick. It has a bulbous base, a white to grey, membranous volva at the stipe base, and white mycelium at the base. The stipe has a white ring. The odor of the flesh is mild to unpleasant.

The spore print is white. Spores are smooth, amyloid, spherical or roughly so, and measure 7–10 by 6.8–9.5 μm. Clamp connections are absent from the hyphae.

=== Similar species ===
Amanita vaginata is similar, however A. vaginata has non-amyloid spores and lacks a ring on the stipe.

It differs from A. phalloides (the death cap) in the colour of its cap.

== Taxonomy ==
The species was first described in 1992 by mycologists Rod Tullos, C.L. Ovebro, and Roy Halling. It is closely related to A. phalloides, and was referred to as this species in the past by Mexican mycologists. It is named after mycologist Regla Maria Aroche.

== Distribution and habitat ==
A. arocheae is found in Mexico, Costa Rica, and Colombia. It is a mycorrhizal species that associates with oak as a host.

== See also ==
- List of Amanita species
- List of deadly fungi
