= Virotoxins =

Group of chemical compounds

Virotoxins are a family of monocyclic peptides that includes at least five compounds: alaviroidin, viroisin, deoxoviroisin, viroidin, and deoxoviroidin. The structure and biological activity of virotoxins are similar to that of phallotoxins, thus suggesting that virotoxins are biosynthetically derived from phallotoxins or share common precursor pathways. As with phallotoxins, virotoxins are not considered to have significant toxic effects after oral exposure. At the molecular level, like phallotoxins, they interact with actin, stabilizing the bonds between actin monomers and preventing microfilaments depolymerization. However, the ultraviolet-spectra of interaction between actin and virotoxins is different from that of actin-phallotoxins, suggesting a different molecular interaction. Virotoxins have a more flexible structure when compared with phallotoxins and the presence of two additional hydroxyl groups may provide different reactivity. The intraperitoneal LD50 of virotoxins in mice ranges from 1.0 to 5.1 mg/kg and their main toxicological feature is hemorrhagic hepatic necrosis caused by an interaction of the virotoxins with outer surface of the hepatocyte through unknown mechanisms. At this point, the role of virotoxins in human toxicity remains unclear, although due to its poor oral absorption, little clinical importance is given to this class of toxins.
