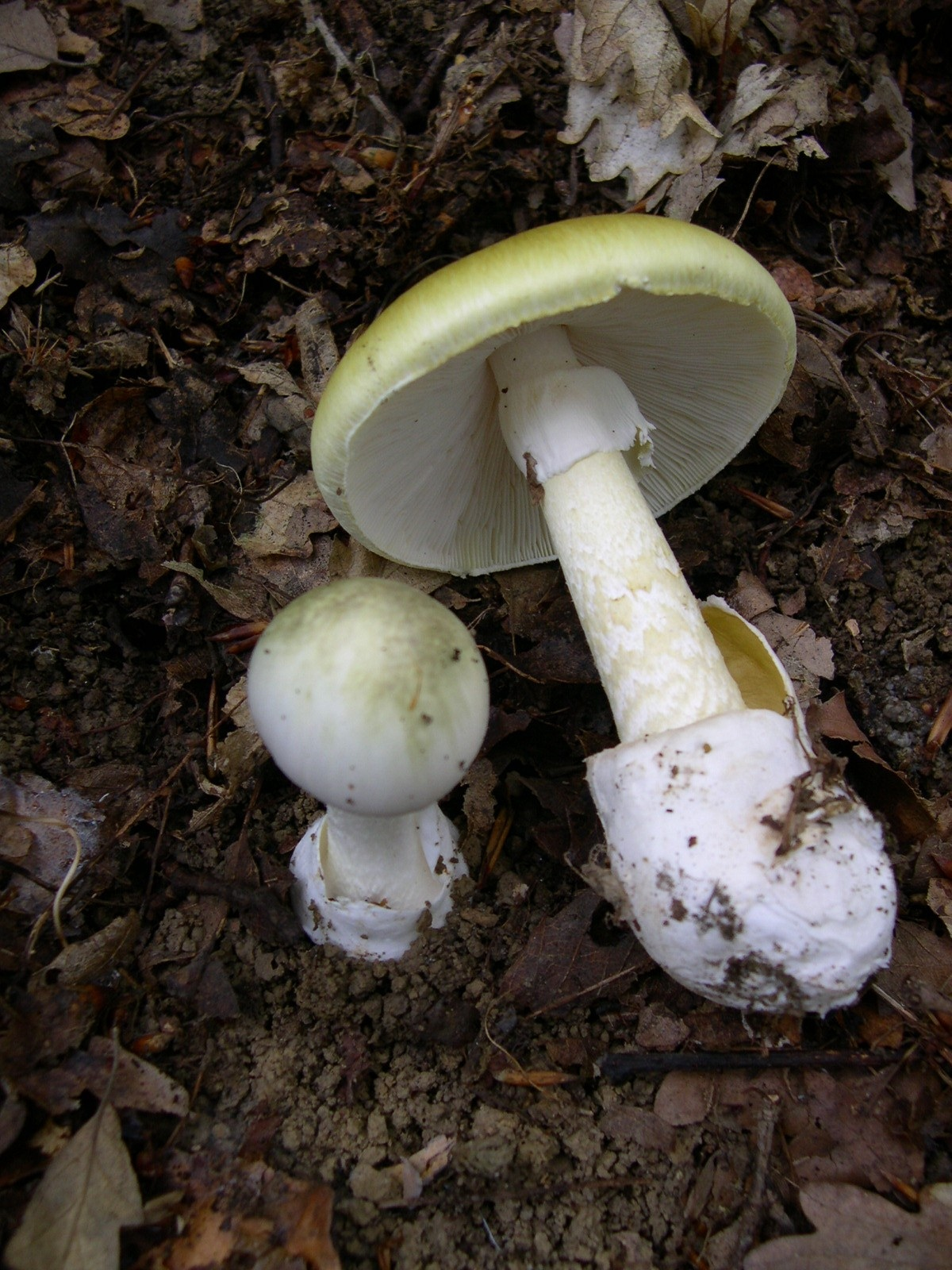
- In Piacenza, Italy

Scientific classification
- Kingdom: Fungi
- Division: Basidiomycota
- Class: Agaricomycetes
- Order: Agaricales
- Family: Amanitaceae
- Genus: Amanita
- Species: A. phalloides

Binomial name
- Amanita phalloides (Vaill. ex Fr.) Link (1833)

= Amanita phalloides =

Poisonous mushroom (death cap)

Amanita phalloides
- Mycological characteristics
- Gills on hymenium
- Cap is convex or flat
- Hymenium is free
- Stipe has a ring and volva
- Spore print is white
- Ecology is mycorrhizal
- Edibility is deadly

Amanita phalloides (/ˌæməˈnaɪtə fəˈlɔɪdiːz/ AM-ə-NY-tə fə-LOY-deez), commonly known as the death cap, is a deadly poisonous basidiomycete fungus and mushroom, one of many in the genus Amanita. Originating in Europe but later introduced to other parts of the world since the late twentieth century, A. phalloides forms ectomycorrhizae with various broadleaved trees. In some cases, the death cap has been introduced to new regions with the cultivation of non-native species of oak, chestnut, and pine. The large fruiting bodies appear in summer and autumn; the caps are generally greenish in colour with a white stipe and gills. The cap colour is variable, including white forms, and is thus not a reliable identifier.

The death cap resembles several edible species (most notably Caesar's mushroom and the straw mushroom) commonly consumed by humans, increasing the risk of accidental poisoning. Amatoxins, a class of toxins found in mushrooms like A. phalloides, are thermostable: they resist changes due to heat and cold, so their toxic effects are not reduced by cooking or freezing.

Amanita phalloides is the most poisonous of all known mushrooms. It is estimated that as little as half a mushroom contains enough toxin to kill an adult human. It is also the deadliest mushroom worldwide, responsible for 90% of mushroom-related fatalities every year. It has been involved in the majority of human deaths from mushroom poisoning, possibly including Roman Emperor Claudius in AD 54 and Holy Roman Emperor Charles VI in 1740. It has also been the subject of much research and many of its biologically active agents have been isolated. The principal toxic constituent is α-Amanitin, which causes liver and kidney failure.

== Taxonomy ==
The death cap is named in Latin as such in the correspondence between the English physician Thomas Browne and Christopher Merrett. It was described by French botanist Sébastien Vaillant in 1727, who gave a succinct phrase name "Fungus phalloides, annulatus, sordide virescens, et patulus" (a phallus-shaped, ring-stemmed, dirty green mushroom with a large 'spreading' cap).

In 1821, Elias Magnus Fries described it as Agaricus phalloides, but included all white amanitas within its description. Finally, in 1833, Johann Heinrich Friedrich Link settled on the name Amanita phalloides, after Persoon had named it Amanita viridis 30 years earlier. Although Louis Secretan's use of the name A. phalloides predates Link's, it has been rejected for nomenclatural purposes because Secretan's works did not use binomial nomenclature consistently; some taxonomists have, however, disagreed with this opinion.

Amanita phalloides is the type species of Amanita section Phalloideae, a group that contains all of the deadly poisonous Amanita species thus far identified. Most notable of these are the species known as destroying angels, including A. virosa, A. bisporigera, A. ocreata, A. verna, and more than a dozen others. The term "destroying angel" has been applied to A. phalloides at times, but "death cap" is by far the most common vernacular name used in English. Other common names also listed include "stinking amanita" and "deadly amanita".

A rarely appearing, all-white form was initially described A. phalloides f. alba by Max Britzelmayr, though its status has been unclear. It is often found growing amid normally colored death caps. It has been described, in 2004, as a distinct variety and includes what was termed A. verna var. tarda. The true A. verna fruits in spring and turns yellow with KOH solution, whereas A. phalloides never does.

== Description ==
The death cap has a large and imposing epigeous (aboveground) fruiting body (basidiocarp), usually with a pileus (cap) from 5 to 15 cm across (2 to 5.8 inches) across, initially rounded and hemispherical, but flattening with age. The color of the cap can be pale-green, yellowish-green, olive-green, bronze, or (in one form) white; it is often paler toward the margins, which can have darker streaks; it is also often paler after rain. The cap surface is sticky when wet and easily peeled—a troublesome feature, as that is allegedly a feature of edible fungi. The remains of the partial veil are seen as a skirtlike, floppy annulus usually about 1 to 1.5 cm (3/8 to 5/8 in) below the cap. The crowded white lamellae (gills) are free. The stipe is white with a scattering of grayish-olive scales and is 8 to 15 cm (3 1/8 to 5 7/8 in) long and 1 to 2 cm (3/8 to 3/4 in) thick, with a swollen, ragged, sac-like white volva (base). As the volva, which may be hidden by leaf litter, is a distinctive and diagnostic feature, it is important to remove some debris to check for it. Spores: 7-12 x 6-9 μm. Smooth, ellipsoid, amyloid.

The smell has been described as initially faint and honey-sweet, but strengthening over time to become overpowering, sickly-sweet and objectionable. Young specimens first emerge from the ground resembling a white egg covered by a universal veil, which then breaks, leaving the volva as a remnant. The spore print is white, a common feature of Amanita. The transparent spores are globular to egg-shaped, measure 8–10 μm (0.3–0.4 mil) long, and stain blue with iodine. The gills, in contrast, stain pallid lilac or pink with concentrated sulfuric acid.

=== Biochemistry ===
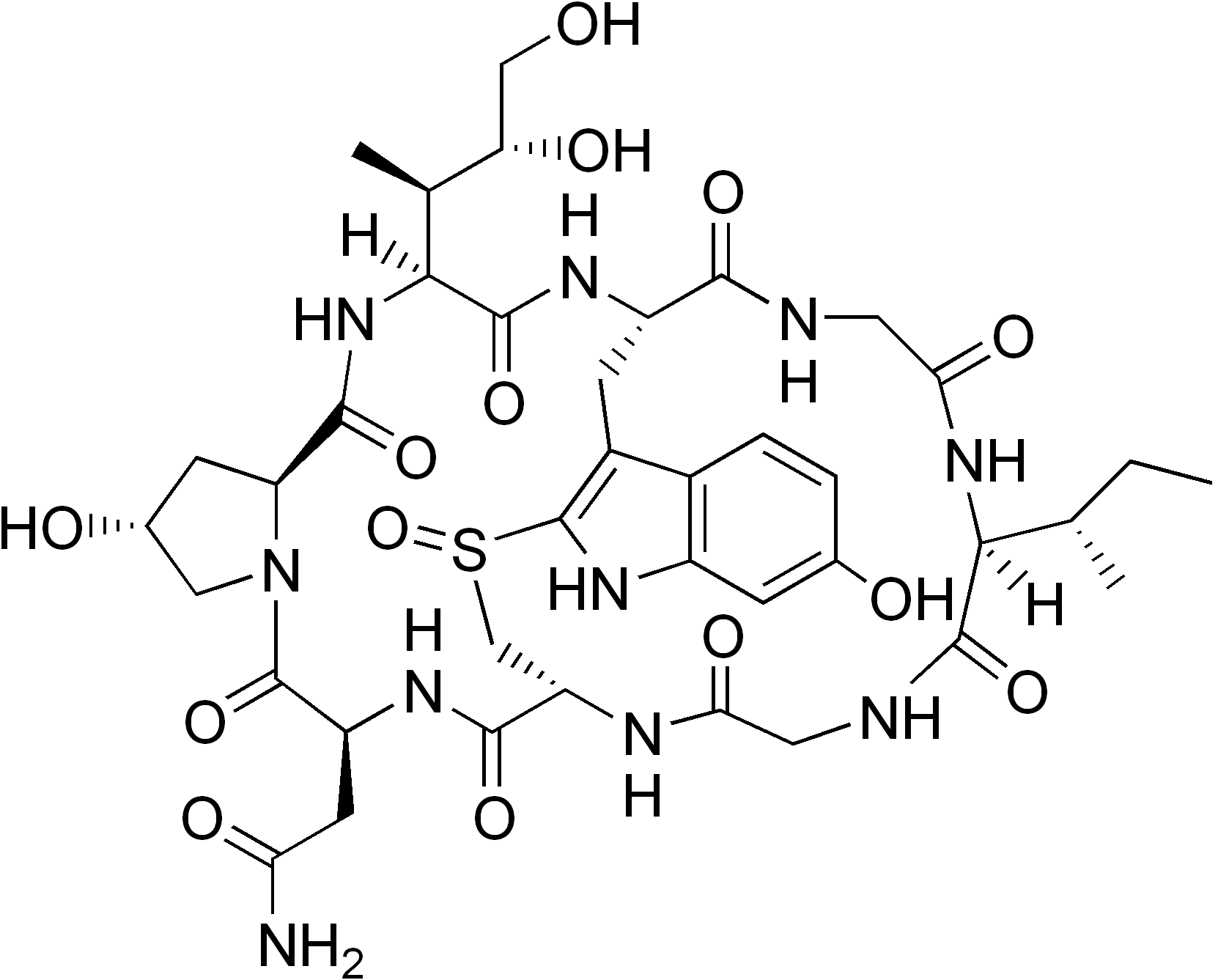
α-Amanitin

β-Amanitin, where an amide of the α-Amanitin has been replaced by a carboxylic acid (lower left corner)

The species is now known to contain two main groups of toxins, both multicyclic (ring-shaped) peptides spread throughout the mushroom, tissue: the amatoxins and the phallotoxins. Another toxin is phallolysin, which has shown some hemolytic (red blood cell–destroying) activity in vitro. An unrelated compound, antamanide, has also been isolated.

Amatoxins consist of at least eight compounds with a similar structure, that of eight amino-acid rings; they were isolated in 1941 by Heinrich O. Wieland and Rudolf Hallermayer of LMU Munich. Of the amatoxins, α-Amanitin is the chief component and along with β-amanitin is likely responsible for the toxic effects. Their major toxic mechanism is the inhibition of RNA polymerase II, a vital enzyme in the synthesis of messenger RNA (mRNA), microRNA, and small nuclear RNA (snRNA). Without mRNA, essential protein synthesis and hence cell metabolism grind to a halt and the cell dies. The liver is the principal organ affected, as it is the organ which is first encountered after absorption in the gastrointestinal tract, though other organs, especially the kidneys, are susceptible. The RNA polymerase of Amanita phalloides is insensitive to the effects of amatoxins, so the mushroom does not poison itself.

The phallotoxins consist of at least seven compounds, all of which have seven similar peptide rings. Phalloidin was isolated in 1937 by Feodor Lynen, Heinrich Wieland's student and son-in-law, and Ulrich Wieland of LMU Munich. Though phallotoxins are highly toxic to liver cells, they have since been found to add little to the death cap's toxicity, as they are not absorbed through the gut. Furthermore, phalloidin is also found in the edible (and sought-after) blusher (A. rubescens). Another group of minor active peptides are the virotoxins, which consist of six similar monocyclic heptapeptides. Like the phallotoxins, they do not induce any acute toxicity after ingestion in humans.

The genome of the death cap has been sequenced.

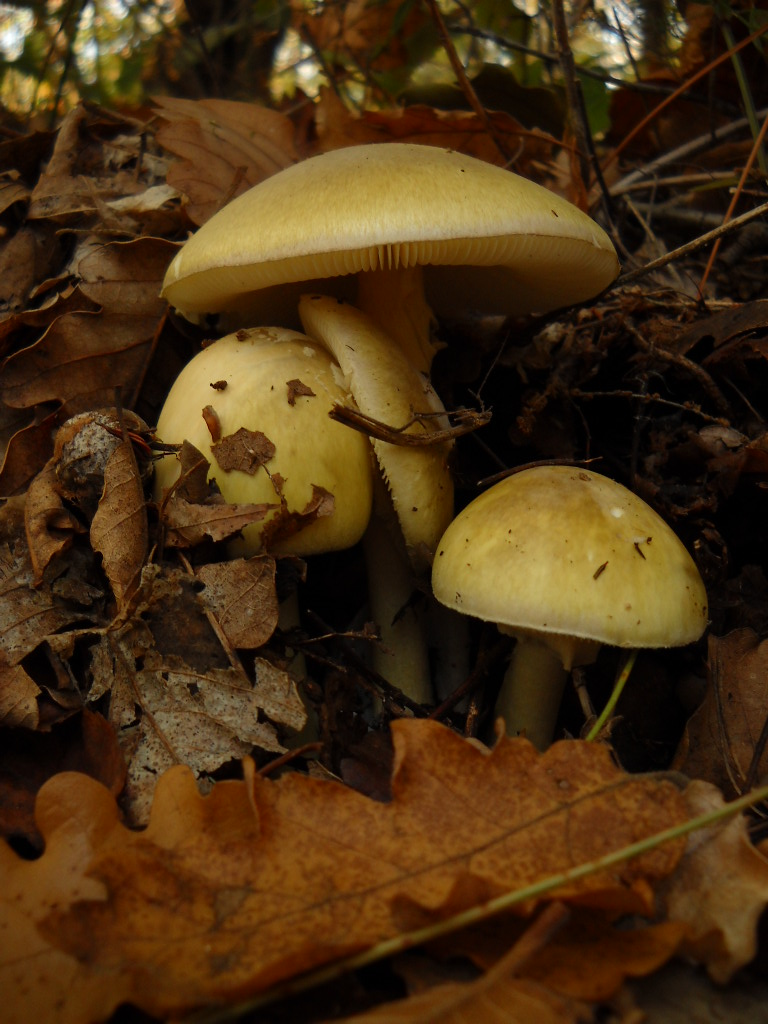
Death caps in French deciduous wood

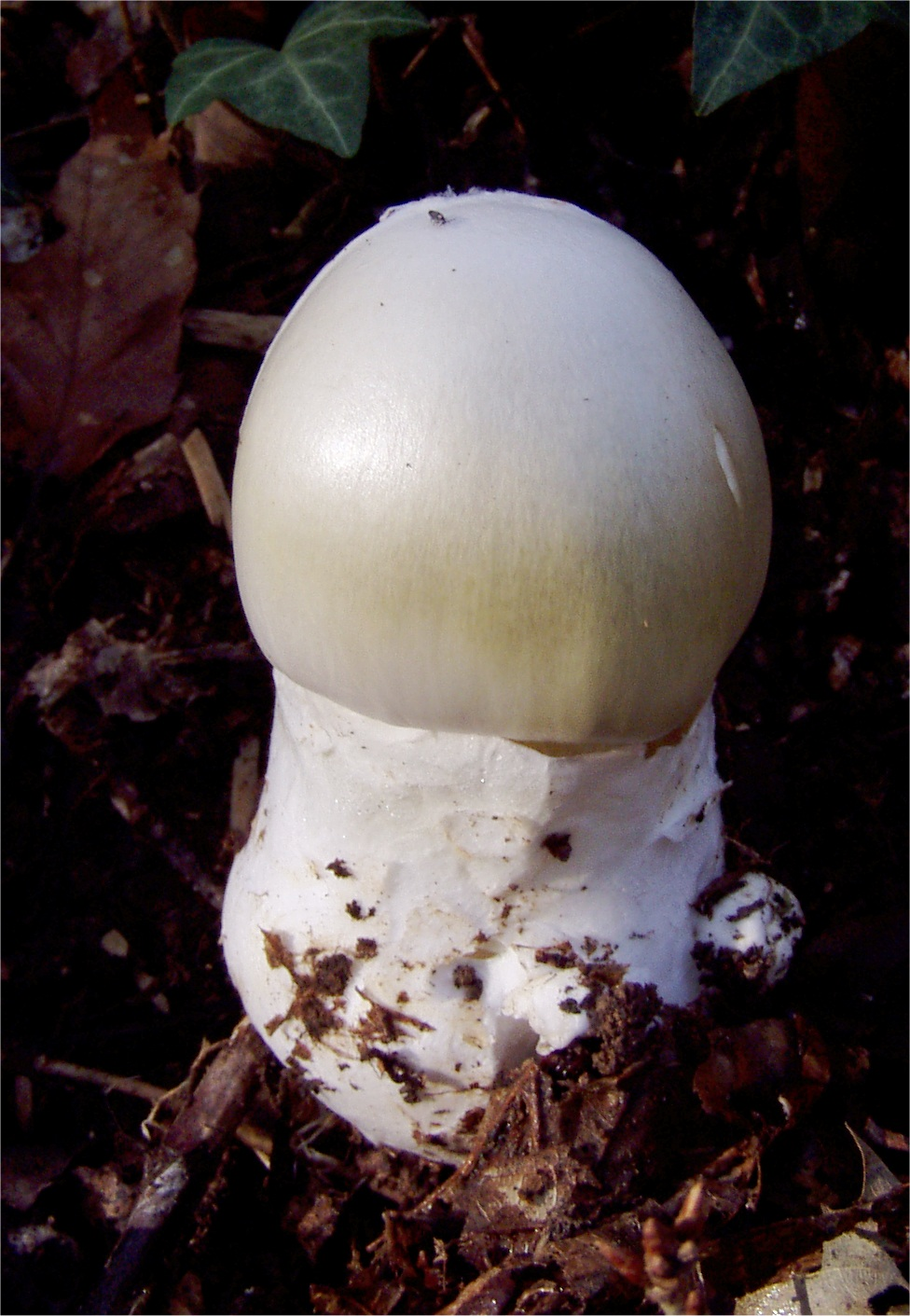
A young death cap emerging from its universal veil

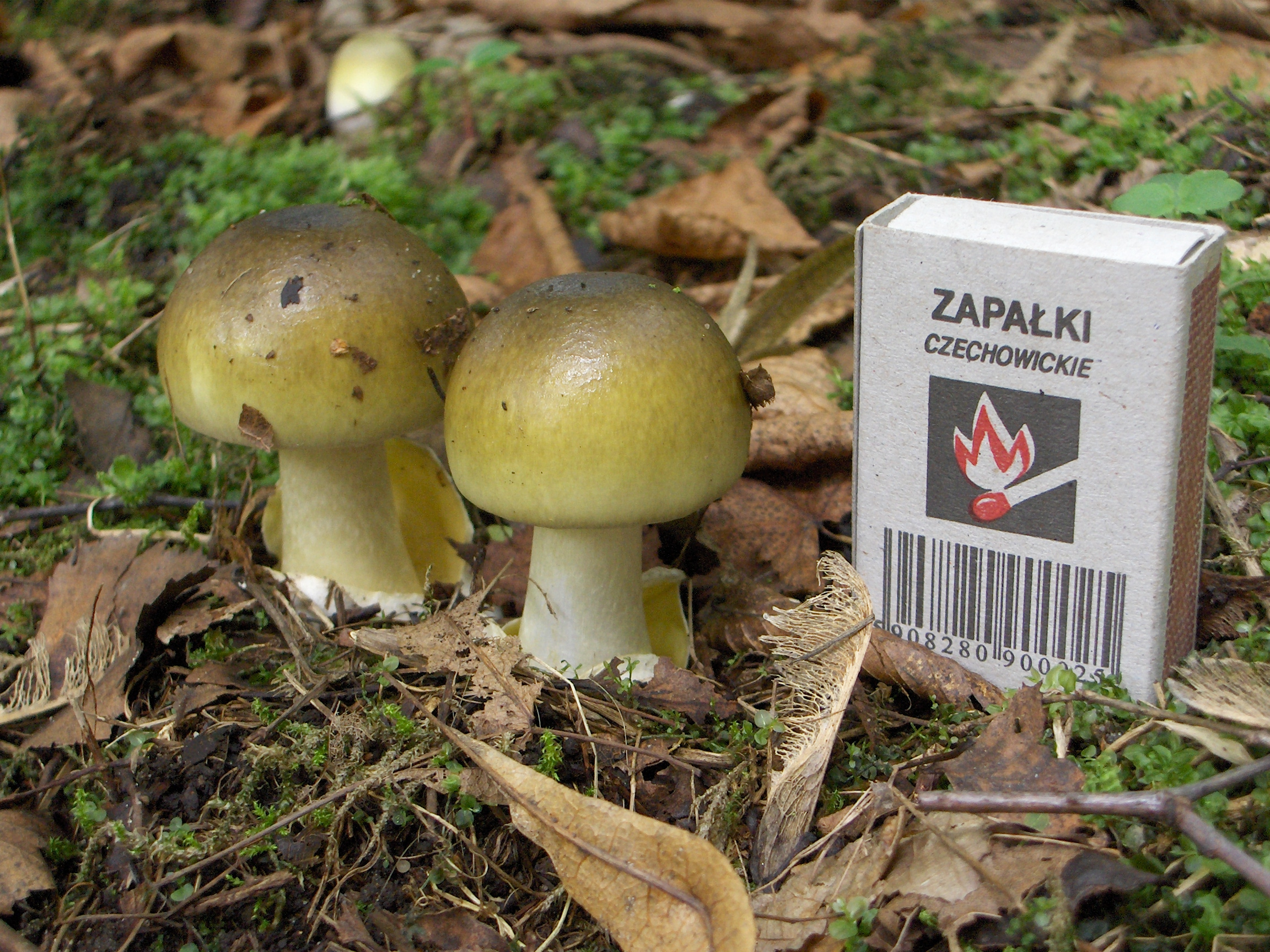
Young death cap mushrooms in Poland, with matchbox for scale

=== Similarity to edible species ===
A. phalloides is similar to the edible paddy straw mushroom (Volvariella volvacea) and A. princeps, commonly known as "white Caesar".

Some may mistake juvenile death caps for edible puffballs or mature specimens for other edible Amanita species, such as A. lanei, so some authorities recommend avoiding the collecting of Amanita species for the table altogether. The white form of A. phalloides may be mistaken for edible species of Agaricus, especially the young fruitbodies whose unexpanded caps conceal the telltale white gills; all mature species of Agaricus have dark-colored gills.

In Europe, other similarly green-capped species collected by mushroom hunters include various green-hued brittlegills of the genus Russula and the formerly popular Tricholoma equestre, now regarded as hazardous owing to a series of restaurant poisonings in France. Brittlegills, such as Russula heterophylla, R. aeruginea, and R. virescens, can be distinguished by their brittle flesh and the lack of both volva and ring. Other similar species include A. subjunquillea in eastern Asia and A. arocheae, which ranges from Andean Colombia north at least as far as central Mexico, both of which are also poisonous.

== Distribution and habitat ==
The death cap is native to Europe, where it is widespread. It is found from the southern coastal regions of Scandinavia in the north, to Ireland in the west, east to Poland and western Russia, and south throughout the Balkans, in Greece, Italy, Spain, and Portugal in the Mediterranean basin, and in Morocco and Algeria in north Africa. In west Asia, it has been reported from forests of northern Iran. There are records from further east in Asia but these have yet to be confirmed as A. phalloides.

By the end of the 19th century, Charles Horton Peck had reported A. phalloides in North America. In 1918, samples from the eastern United States were identified as being a distinct though similar species, A. brunnescens, by George Francis Atkinson of Cornell University. By the 1970s, it had become clear that A. phalloides does occur in the United States, apparently having been introduced from Europe alongside chestnuts, with populations on the West and East Coasts. A 2006 historical review concluded the East Coast populations were inadvertently introduced, likely on the roots of other purposely imported plants such as chestnuts. The origins of the West Coast populations remained unclear, due to scant historical records, but a 2009 genetic study provided strong evidence for the introduced status of the fungus on the west coast of North America. Observations of various collections of A. phalloides, from conifers rather than native forests, have led to the hypothesis that the species was introduced to North America multiple times. It is hypothesized that the various introductions led to multiple genotypes which are adapted to either oaks or conifers.

Californian specimens of A. phalloides frequently display yellowish to mustard-yellow caps, a coloration that can closely resemble the edible species Amanita velosa and Amanita calyptroderma, both of which are commonly foraged and consumed in California. This deceptive appearance is the result of environmental homoplasy with Asian cousin Amanita subjunquillea: the fungus expresses a phylogenetically conserved pigment palette (derived from the shikimate pathway) under the particular microclimatic conditions of coastal California oak woodlands. Prolonged high humidity from summer fog drip, followed by intense sunlight and oxidative stress once the fog burns off, upregulates polyphenolic compounds and causes oxidative bleaching of the originally greener or olive tones, producing the characteristic yellowish hues. Such similarity poses a significant risk of fatal misidentification for foragers, as the highly toxic death cap may be mistaken for these otherwise edible look-alikes.

A. phalloides were conveyed to new countries across the Southern Hemisphere with the importation of hardwoods and conifers in the late twentieth century. Introduced oaks appear to have been the vector to Australia and South America; populations under oaks have been recorded from Melbourne, Canberra (where two people died in January 2012, of four who were poisoned), Adelaide, and further observed by citizen scientists in Beechworth, Sydney and Albury. It has been recorded under other introduced trees in Argentina. Pine plantations are associated with the fungus in Tanzania and South Africa, found under oaks and poplars in Chile, as well as Uruguay. A number of deaths in India have been attributed to it.

== Ecology ==
It is ectomycorrhizally associated with several tree species and is symbiotic with them. In Europe, these include hardwood and, less frequently, conifer species. It appears most commonly under oaks, but also under beeches, chestnuts, horse-chestnuts, birches, filberts, hornbeams, pines, and spruces. In other areas, A. phalloides may also be associated with these trees or with only some species. In coastal California, for example, A. phalloides is associated with coast live oak. In countries where it has been introduced, it has been restricted to those exotic trees with which it would associate in its natural range. There is, however, evidence of A. phalloides associating with hemlock and with genera of the Myrtaceae: Eucalyptus in Tanzania and Algeria, and Leptospermum and Kunzea in New Zealand, suggesting that the species may have invasive potential. It may have also been anthropogenically introduced to the island of Cyprus, where it has been documented to fruit within Corylus avellana plantations.

This species has once been recorded as food of the pleasing fungus beetle Rotitma sanguinipennis; no other such observation was known as of 1999, and the record is more likely a mix-up with the related Tritoma mimetica, which can indeed be found on Amanita species. It has also been found with adults of the related beetle T.b.biguttata, but it does not seem to be a regular food source for them.

== Toxicity ==
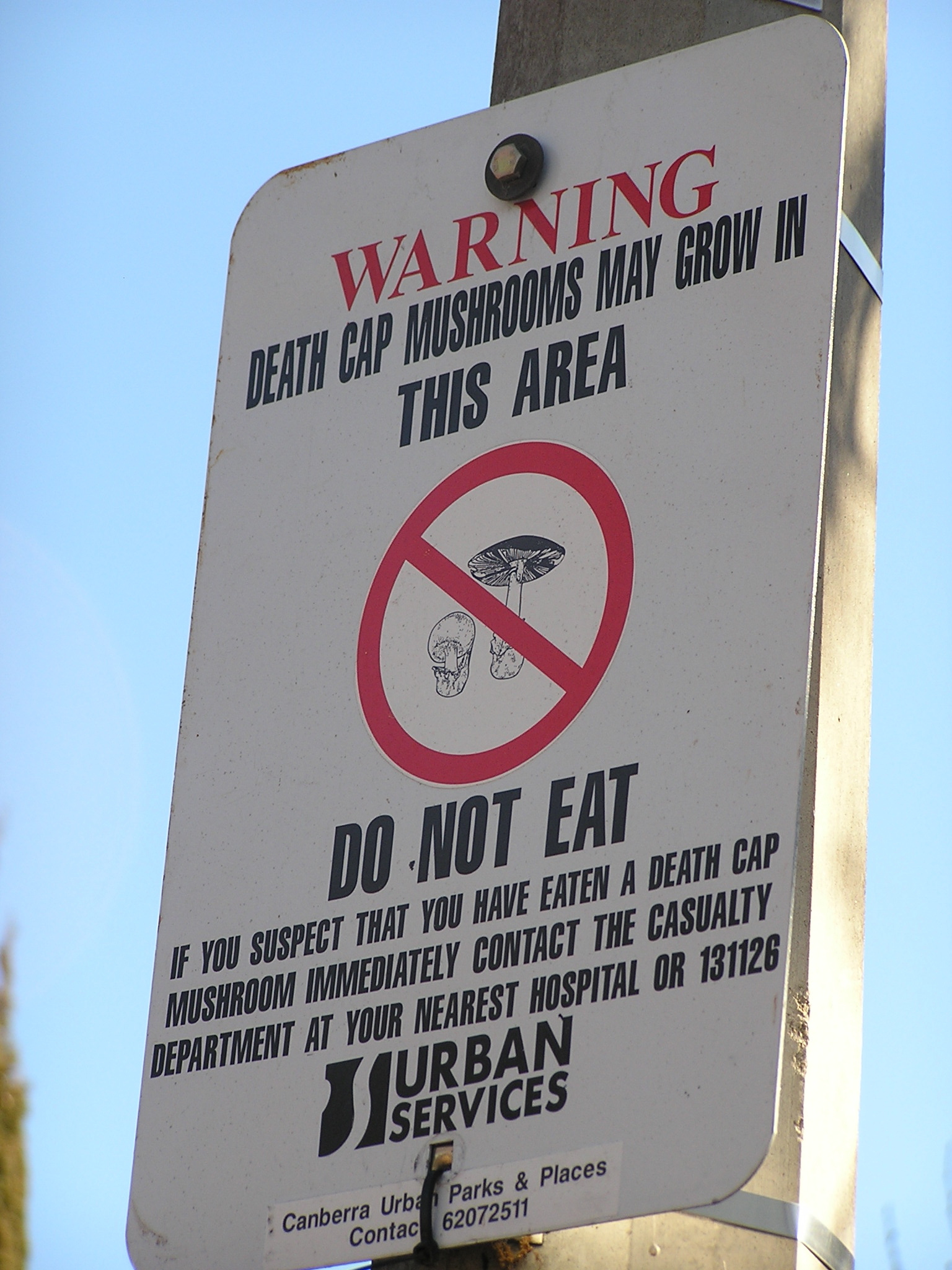
Warning sign in Canberra, Australia

The fungus is highly toxic, and is responsible for the majority of fatal mushroom poisonings worldwide. Its biochemistry has been researched intensively for decades, and 30 grams (1.1 ounces), or half a cap, of this mushroom is estimated to be enough to kill a human. On average, one person dies a year in North America from death cap ingestion. The toxins of the death cap mushrooms primarily target the liver, but other organs, such as the kidneys, are also affected. Symptoms of death cap mushroom toxicity usually occur 6 to 12 hours after ingestion. In more serious cases, symptoms may appear in less than 6 hours. In milder poisoning, onset might be as long as 2-3 days. Symptoms of ingestion of the death cap mushroom may include nausea and vomiting, which is then followed by jaundice, seizures, and coma, which will lead to death. The mortality rate of ingestion of the death cap mushroom is believed to be around 10–30%.

Some authorities strongly advise against putting suspected death caps in the same basket with fungi collected for the table and to avoid even touching them. Furthermore, the toxicity is not reduced by cooking, freezing, or drying.

Poisoning incidents usually result from errors in identification. Recent cases highlight the issue of the similarity of A. phalloides to the edible paddy straw mushroom (Volvariella volvacea), with East and Southeast Asian immigrants in Australia and the West Coast of the U.S. falling victim. In an episode in Oregon, four members of a Korean family required liver transplants. Many North American incidents of death cap poisoning have occurred among Laotian and Hmong immigrants, since it is easily confused with A. princeps ("white Caesar"), a popular mushroom in their native countries. Of the nine people poisoned in Australia's Canberra region between 1988 and 2011, three were from Laos and two were from China. In January 2012, four people were accidentally poisoned when death caps (reportedly misidentified as straw mushrooms, which are popular in Chinese and other Asian dishes) were served for dinner in Canberra; all the victims required hospital treatment and two of them died, with a third requiring a liver transplant.

=== Detection ===
The so-called Meixner test is used to detect the presence of amatoxins in a sample. The test gives false positive results for psilocin, psilocybin, and 5-substituted tryptamines.

=== Signs and symptoms ===
Death caps have been reported to taste pleasant. This, coupled with the delay in the appearance of symptoms—during which time internal organs are being severely, sometimes irreparably, damaged—makes them particularly dangerous. Initially, symptoms are gastrointestinal in nature and include colicky abdominal pain, with watery diarrhea, nausea, and vomiting, which may lead to dehydration if left untreated, and, in severe cases, hypotension, tachycardia, hypoglycemia, and acid–base disturbances. These first symptoms resolve two to three days after the ingestion. A more serious deterioration signifying liver involvement may then occur—jaundice, diarrhea, delirium, seizures, and coma due to fulminant liver failure and attendant hepatic encephalopathy caused by the accumulation of normally liver-removed substances in the blood. Kidney failure (either secondary to severe hepatitis or caused by direct toxic kidney damage) and coagulopathy may appear during this stage. Life-threatening complications include increased intracranial pressure, intracranial bleeding, pancreatic inflammation, acute kidney failure, and cardiac arrest. Death generally occurs six to sixteen days after the poisoning.

It is noticed that after up to 24 hours have passed, the symptoms seem to disappear and the person might feel fine for up to 72 hours. Symptoms of liver and kidney damage start 3 to 6 days after the mushrooms were eaten, with the considerable increase of the transaminases.

Mushroom poisoning is more common in Europe than in North America. Up to the mid-20th century, the mortality rate was around 60–70%, but this has been greatly reduced with advances in medical care. A review of death cap poisoning throughout Europe from 1971 to 1980 found the overall mortality rate to be 22.4% (51.3% in children under ten and 16.5% in those older than ten). This was revised to around 10–15% in surveys reviewed in 1995.

=== Treatment ===
Consumption of the death cap is a medical emergency requiring hospitalization. The four main categories of therapy for poisoning are preliminary medical care, supportive measures, specific treatments, and liver transplantation.

Preliminary care consists of gastric decontamination with either activated carbon or gastric lavage; due to the delay between ingestion and the first symptoms of poisoning, it is common for patients to arrive for treatment many hours after ingestion, potentially reducing the efficacy of these interventions. Supportive measures are directed towards treating the dehydration which results from fluid loss during the gastrointestinal phase of intoxication and correction of metabolic acidosis, hypoglycemia, electrolyte imbalances, and impaired coagulation.

No definitive antidote is available, but some specific treatments have been shown to improve survivability. High-dose continuous intravenous penicillin G has been reported to be of benefit, though the exact mechanism is unknown, and trials with cephalosporins show promise. Some evidence indicates intravenous silibinin, an extract from the blessed milk thistle (Silybum marianum), may be beneficial in reducing the effects of death cap poisoning. A long-term clinical trial of intravenous silibinin began in the US in 2010. Silibinin prevents the uptake of amatoxins by liver cells, thereby protecting undamaged liver tissue; it also stimulates DNA-dependent RNA polymerases, leading to an increase in RNA synthesis. According to one report based on a treatment of 60 patients with silibinin, patients who started the drug within 96 hours of ingesting the mushroom and who still had intact kidney function all survived. As of February 2014 supporting research has not yet been published.

SLCO1B3 has been identified as the human hepatic uptake transporter for amatoxins; moreover, substrates and inhibitors of that protein—among others rifampicin, penicillin, silibinin, antamanide, paclitaxel, ciclosporin and prednisolone—may be useful for the treatment of human amatoxin poisoning.

N-Acetylcysteine has shown promise in combination with other therapies. Animal studies indicate the amatoxins deplete hepatic glutathione; N-acetylcysteine serves as a glutathione precursor and may therefore prevent reduced glutathione levels and subsequent liver damage. None of the antidotes used have undergone prospective, randomized clinical trials, and only anecdotal support is available. Silibinin and N-acetylcysteine appear to be the therapies with the most potential benefit. Repeated doses of activated carbon may be helpful by absorbing any toxins returned to the gastrointestinal tract following enterohepatic circulation. Other methods of enhancing the elimination of the toxins have been trialed; techniques such as hemodialysis, hemoperfusion, plasmapheresis, and peritoneal dialysis have occasionally yielded success, but overall do not appear to improve outcome.

In patients developing liver failure, a liver transplant is often the only option to prevent death. Liver transplants have become a well-established option in amatoxin poisoning. This is a complicated issue, however, as transplants themselves may have significant complications and mortality; patients require long-term immunosuppression to maintain the transplant. That being the case, the criteria have been reassessed, such as onset of symptoms, prothrombin time (PT), serum bilirubin, and presence of encephalopathy, for determining at what point a transplant becomes necessary for survival. Evidence suggests, although survival rates have improved with modern medical treatment, in patients with moderate to severe poisoning, up to half of those who did recover suffered permanent liver damage. A follow-up study has shown most survivors recover completely without any sequelae if treated within 36 hours of mushroom ingestion.

== Oncology ==
During the 2020s, scientists have turned one deadly amanitin produced by Amanita phalloides into a promising weapon against cancer. Once known only as the cause of fatal mushroom poisoning, this molecule is now used as the "payload" in a new type of targeted therapy called ATACs (α-amanitin-based antibody-drug conjugates). These drugs consist of a monoclonal antibody that seeks out cancer cells, linked to α-amanitin, which is released inside the tumor to destroy it. What makes α-amanitin especially effective is its unique way of working: it blocks RNA polymerase II, the enzyme that cells use to read their DNA and produce essential proteins. Unlike most chemotherapy drugs, it acts independently of the cell cycle, so it can kill not only rapidly dividing cancer cells but also the slow-growing or "dormant" cancer stem cells that often survive standard treatments and cause relapse.

The most advanced candidate is HDP-101 (pamlectabart tismanitin), developed by Heidelberg Pharma. It targets the BCMA protein on multiple myeloma cells. In the ongoing Phase I/IIa clinical trial (NCT04879043), the drug was safely escalated up to 218 µg/kg. It received FDA Fast Track designation in October 2025, and the recommended Phase II dose was chosen in April 2026. In the higher-dose groups (90–140 µg/kg), response rates ranged from 38 % to 57 %, with some heavily pretreated patients, including those who had already failed other BCMA-targeted therapies, achieving deep and lasting complete remissions of more than one year. Side effects have been mostly mild to moderate and manageable, with no significant liver, eye, or kidney toxicity reported.

The ATAC approach is also showing potential in solid tumors. TROP2-targeted conjugates have completely eradicated tumors in preclinical models of pancreatic cancer and triple-negative breast cancer, outperforming the approved drug sacituzumab govitecan. In January 2026, Takeda began a Phase I/II clinical trial of an ATAC candidate for solid tumors. These advances have been reviewed in a 2026 editorial by Italian amanitologist Danny LeVan-Cicchetti, demonstrating how α-amanitin can overcome drug resistance and attack the hidden roots of cancer, offering new promising hope in precision oncology as of May 2026.

== Notable victims ==
This mushroom dish has changed the destiny of Europe.

— Voltaire, Mémoires

Several historical figures may have died from A. phalloides poisoning (or other similar toxic Amanita species). These were either accidental poisonings or assassination plots. Alleged victims of this kind of poisoning include Roman Emperor Claudius, Pope Clement VII, the Russian tsaritsa Natalia Naryshkina, and Holy Roman Emperor Charles VI.

R. Gordon Wasson recounted the details of these deaths, noting the likelihood of Amanita poisoning. In the case of Clement VII, the illness that led to his death lasted five months, making the case inconsistent with amatoxin poisoning. Natalya Naryshkina is said to have consumed a large quantity of pickled mushrooms prior to her death. It is unclear whether the mushrooms themselves were poisonous or if she succumbed to food poisoning.

Charles VI, Holy Roman Emperor experienced indigestion after eating a dish of sautéed mushrooms in October 1740. This led to an illness from which he died 10 days later—symptomatology consistent with amatoxin poisoning. His death caused the end of the agnatic line of the House of Habsburg and led to the War of the Austrian Succession. Noted Voltaire, "this mushroom dish has changed the destiny of Europe."

The case of Claudius's poisoning is more complex. Claudius was known to have been very fond of eating Caesar's mushroom. Following his death, many sources have attributed it to his being fed a meal of death caps instead of Caesar's mushrooms. Ancient authors, such as Tacitus and Suetonius, are unanimous about poison having been added to the mushroom dish, rather than the dish having been prepared from poisonous mushrooms. Wasson speculated the poison used to kill Claudius was derived from death caps, with a fatal dose of an unknown poison (possibly a variety of nightshade) being administered later during his illness. Other historians have speculated that Claudius may have died of natural causes.

In the 2023 Leongatha mushroom murders, Australian woman Erin Patterson was found guilty of three murders and one attempted murder of members of her estranged husband's family by serving them beef Wellingtons that contained A. phalloides. Three of the four guests died within days of the meal, while one survived after weeks in a coma.

== See also ==
- List of Amanita species
- List of deadly fungi
- Hôpital Fernand-Widal – Paris hospital founded as Maison Dubois, known for expertise in treating mushroom poisoning
