= Antamanide =

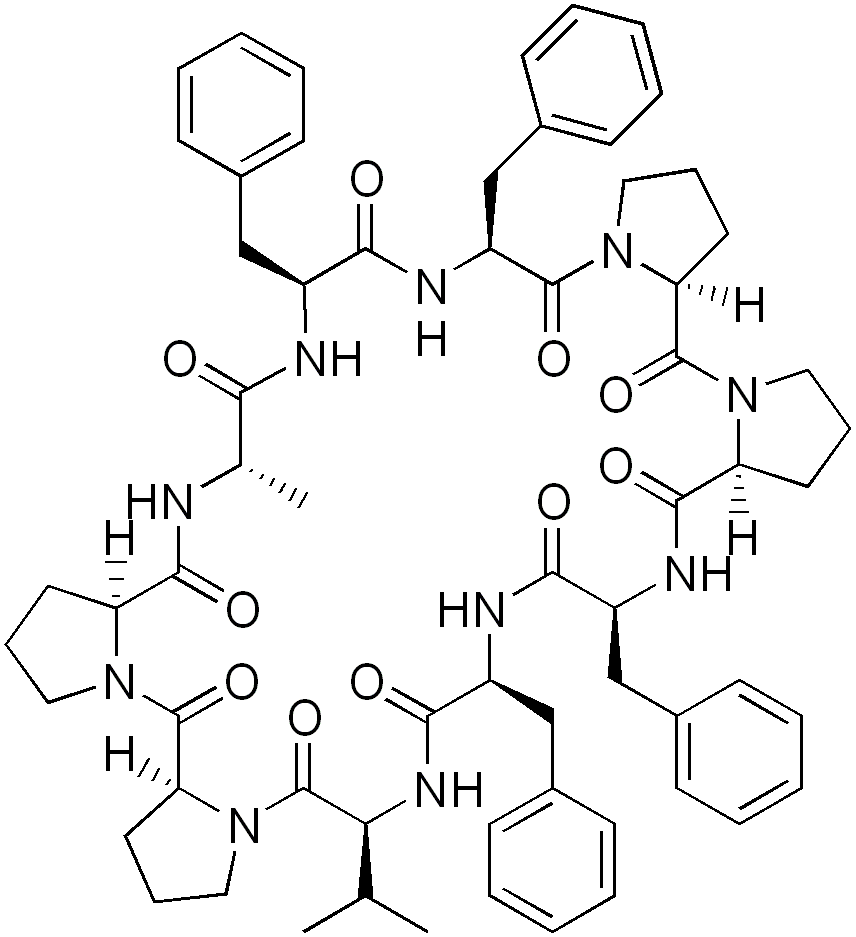

Identifiers
CAS Number	16898-32-1
3D model (JSmol)	Interactive image
ChemSpider	2300791
ECHA InfoCard	100.037.203
PubChem CID	9876840
CompTox Dashboard (EPA)	DTXSID80903964
- InChI: InChI=1S/C64H78N10O10/c1-40(2)54-64(84)74-35-19-31-53(74)63(83)71-32-16-28-50(71)59(79)65-41(3)55(75)66-46(36-42-20-8-4-9-21-42)57(77)69-49(39-45-26-14-7-15-27-45)61(81)73-34-18-30-52(73)62(82)72-33-17-29-51(72)60(80)68-47(37-43-22-10-5-11-23-43)56(76)67-48(58(78)70-54)38-44-24-12-6-13-25-44/h4-15,20-27,40-41,46-54H,16-19,28-39H2,1-3H3,(H,65,79)(H,66,75)(H,67,76)(H,68,80)(H,69,77)(H,70,78)/t41-,46-,47-,48-,49-,50-,51-,52-,53-,54-/m0/s1 Key: WTINJQXJTHUFRF-IHTIUHOMSA-N
- SMILES: C[C@H]1C(=O)N[C@H](C(=O)N[C@H](C(=O)N2CCC[C@H]2C(=O)N3CCC[C@H]3C(=O)N[C@H](C(=O)N[C@H](C(=O)N[C@H](C(=O)N4CCC[C@H]4C(=O)N5CCC[C@H]5C(=O)N1)C(C)C)Cc6ccccc6)Cc7ccccc7)Cc8ccccc8)Cc9ccccc9

Properties
Chemical formula	C_{64}H_{78}N_{10}O_{10}
Molar mass	1147.36 g/mol
- Except where otherwise noted, data are given for materials in their standard state (at 25 °C [77 °F], 100 kPa). verify (what is ?) Infobox references

Antamanide is a cyclic decapeptide isolated from a fungus, the death cap: Amanita phalloides. It was being studied in 1995 as a potential anti-toxin against the effects of phalloidin and for its potential for treating edema. It contains 1 valine residue, 4 proline residues, 1 alanine residue, and 4 phenylalanine residues with a structure of c(Val-Pro-Pro-Ala-Phe-Phe-Pro-Pro-Phe-Phe). It was isolated by determining the source of the anti-phalloidin activity from a lipophillic extraction from the organism. It has been shown that antamanide can react to form alkali metal ion complexes. These include complexes with sodium and calcium ions. When these complexes are formed, the cyclopeptide structure undergoes a conformational change.

== Biochemical properties ==
Anantamide has been shown to make many different types of biochemical activity.

=== Effect of altering the peptide structure on anti-phalloidin activity ===
It has been shown that altering any of the proline residues reduces the inhibitory activity to zero. In addition, altering the phenylalanine residues to tyrosine or L-cyclohexylalanine also reduces the activity to zero.

=== Inhibitor of mitochondrial permeability transition pore ===
It has also been shown that the compound inhibits mitochondrial permeability transition pore (MPTP) by inhibiting the activity of the pore regulator, cyclophilin D (CyP-D). CyP-D is a peptidyl-prolyl cis-trans isomerase or protein that causes a proline residue in a peptide to switch from its trans isomer to its cis isomer. Studies have been done using the Calcium retention capacity (CRC) assay on mouse liver mitochondria in order to measure antamanide's effect on the permeability transition pore. The data from this experiment showed that antamanide inhibits pore opening like the known inhibitors CsA and Ubiquinone 0. It has been found that altering the 6 and 9 positions in the cyclic peptide ring disables the inhibitory effect on the pore by the drug. A study has also been to determine whether the antamanide also inhibits the apoptosis (programmed cell death) of human cervical carcinoma cells caused by the permeability transition pore. The results showed an inhibitory response. Studying for inhibitors of MPTP is important because MPTP induction is connected to many diseases, such as muscular dystrophies (a disease that weakens the musculoskeletal system), hepatotoxicity (chemical caused liver damage), and ischemic injury of the kidneys (injury causing restriction of blood supply to the kidneys).

== Synthesis of antamanide ==
The first synthesis of this natural product was in 1969. Since then many different types of synthetic routes have been used to make the compound. One common method for the synthesis of the linear form of antamanide is the excluded protecting group (EPG) method. In this process, each of the peptides in the cycle are connected to one another one at a time by coupling reactions. In this case, first a valine residue is protected by the Fmoc protecting group to protect the amine group in the amino acid. The peptide is then coupled to an OICh (cholestene) group. OICh is a protecting group used to protect the carboxyl group in the amino acid. Next, the Fmoc group is removed to make an amine by using diethyl amine (Et2N). The next amino acid in the peptide chain is then added to the amine in the same type of coupling reaction, and the process is repeated until the chain form of the cycle is complete. The OICh group is removed by using powdered zinc with acetic acid.
