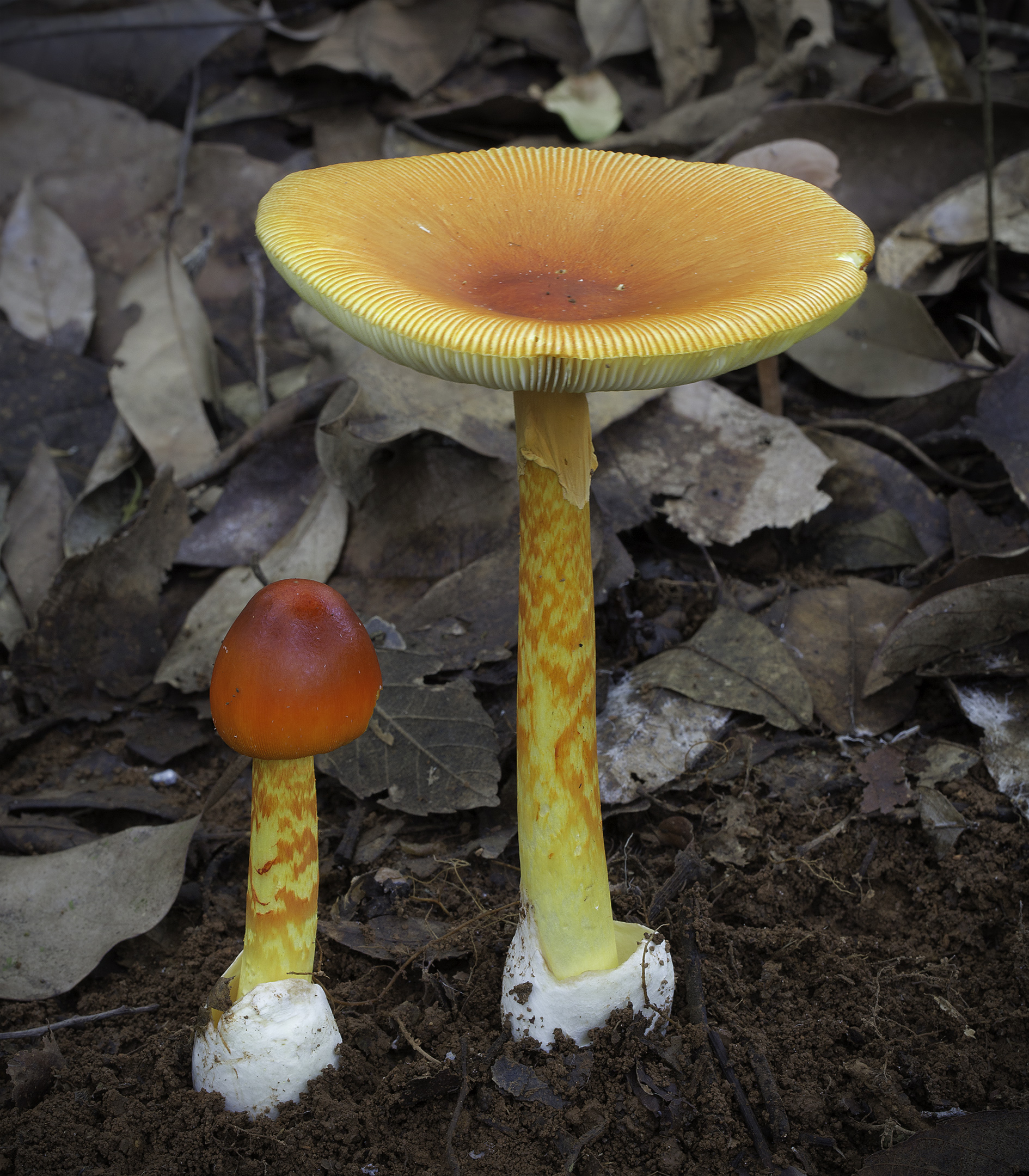

Scientific classification
- Kingdom: Fungi
- Division: Basidiomycota
- Class: Agaricomycetes
- Order: Agaricales
- Family: Amanitaceae
- Genus: Amanita
- Species: A. hemibapha

Binomial name
- Amanita hemibapha (Berk. & Broome) Sacc.

Synonyms
- Agaricus hemibaphus Berk. & Broome

= Amanita hemibapha =

Species of fungus

Amanita hemibapha
- Mycological characteristics
- Gills on hymenium
- Cap is convex or flat
- Hymenium is free
- Stipe has a ring and volva
- Spore print is white
- Ecology is mycorrhizal
- Edibility is not recommended

Amanita hemibapha, commonly known as the half-dyed slender Caesar, is a species of agaric found in southeast Asia and Oceania, although some distribution reports may refer to different taxa.

== Toxicity ==
The variant Amanita hemibapha var. ochracea found in China has been reported to cause dizziness and nausea after eaten in large quantities. Thus, human consumption is generally not recommended. The species is also noted to be confusable with the lethally toxic Amanita subjunquillea.

== See also ==
- List of Amanita species
