= Phalloidin =

Class of toxins called phallotoxins

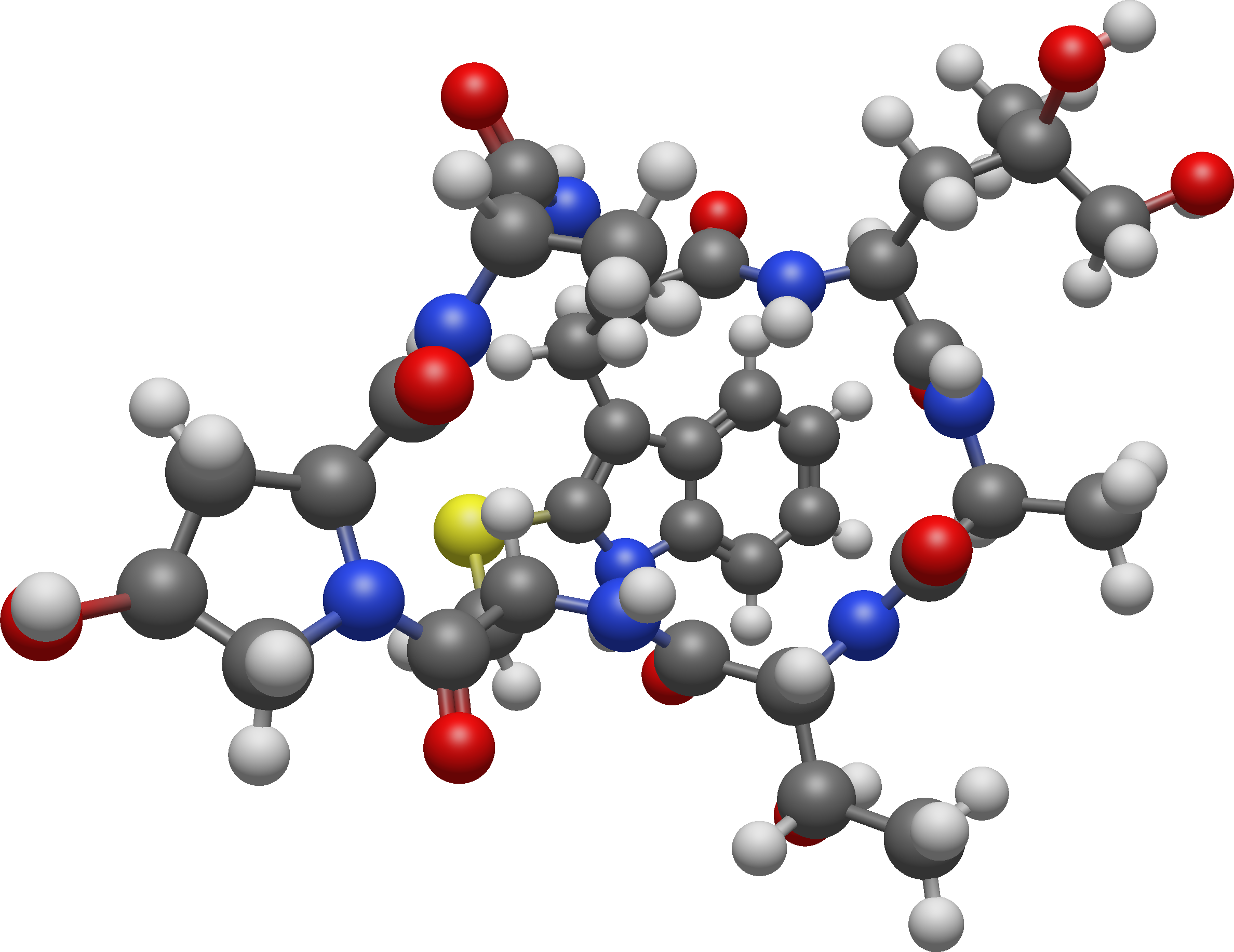

Identifiers
CAS Number	17466-45-4
3D model (JSmol)	Interactive image
ChEBI	CHEBI:8040
ChemSpider	28467534
ECHA InfoCard	100.037.697
PubChem CID	441542
UNII	5A520O87TI
CompTox Dashboard (EPA)	DTXSID3037254
- InChI: InChI=1S/C35H48N8O11S/c1-15-27(47)38-22-10-20-19-7-5-6-8-21(19)41-33(20)55-13-24(34(53)43-12-18(46)9-25(43)31(51)37-15)40-32(52)26(17(3)45)42-28(48)16(2)36-30(50)23(39-29(22)49)11-35(4,54)14-44/h5-8,15-18,22-26,41,44-46,54H,9-14H2,1-4H3,(H,36,50)(H,37,51)(H,38,47)(H,39,49)(H,40,52)(H,42,48)/t15-,16?,17-,18+,22-,23-,24+,25-,26+,35+/m0/s1 Key: KPKZJLCSROULON-RCGKFKHASA-N; InChI=1/C35H48N8O11S/c1-15-27(47)38-22-10-20-19-7-5-6-8-21(19)41-33(20)55-13-24(34(53)43-12-18(46)9-25(43)31(51)37-15)40-32(52)26(17(3)45)42-28(48)16(2)36-30(50)23(39-29(22)49)11-35(4,54)14-44/h5-8,15-18,22-26,41,44-46,54H,9-14H2,1-4H3,(H,36,50)(H,37,51)(H,38,47)(H,39,49)(H,40,52)(H,42,48)/t15-,16?,17-,18+,22-,23-,24+,25-,26+,35+/m0/s1 Key: KPKZJLCSROULON-RCGKFKHABO
- SMILES: C[C@H]1C(=O)N[C@H]2Cc3c4ccccc4[nH]c3SC[C@H](C(=O)N5C[C@@H](C[C@H]5C(=O)N1)O)NC(=O)[C@H](NC(=O)C(NC(=O)[C@@H](NC2=O)C[C@](C)(CO)O)C)[C@H](C)O

Properties
Chemical formula	C_{35}H_{48}N_{8}O_{11}S
Molar mass	788.87 g·mol^{−1}
Appearance	white needle-like crystals
Melting point	281 °C (538 °F; 554 K) (hyd)
- Except where otherwise noted, data are given for materials in their standard state (at 25 °C [77 °F], 100 kPa). verify (what is ?) Infobox references

Phalloidin belongs to a class of toxins called phallotoxins, which are found in mushrooms of the genus Amanita. It is a rigid bicyclic heptapeptide that is lethal after a few days when injected into the bloodstream. The major symptom of phalloidin poisoning is acute hunger due to the destruction of liver cells. It functions by binding and stabilizing filamentous actin (F-actin) and effectively prevents the depolymerization of actin fibers. Due to its tight and selective binding to F-actin, derivatives of phalloidin containing fluorescent tags are used widely in microscopy to visualize F-actin in biomedical research.

== Discovery and background ==
Phalloidin was one of the first cyclic peptides to be discovered. It was isolated from the death cap mushroom and crystallized by Feodor Lynen and Ulrich Wieland in 1937. Its structure is unusual in that it contains a cysteine-tryptophan linkage to form a bicyclic heptapeptide. This linkage had not been characterized before and makes the structure elucidation of phalloidin significantly more difficult. They determined the presence of the sulfur atom using UV spectroscopy and found that this ring structure had a slightly shifted wavelength. Raney nickel experiments confirmed the presence of sulfur in the tryptophan ring. The researchers found the desulfurized phalloidin was still circular, which demonstrated that the structure of phalloidin is normally bicyclic. Once linearized, the amino acid sequence of de-sulfurized phalloidin was elucidated through Edman degradation by Wieland and Schön in 1955.

Due to its high affinity for actin, scientists discovered its potential use as a staining reagent for effective visualization of actin in microscopy. Derivatives conjugated with fluorophores are sold widely. Because of its ability to selectively bind filamentous actin (F-actin) and not actin monomers (G-actin), fluorescently labeled phalloidin is more effective than antibodies against actin.

== Synthesis ==
=== Biosynthesis ===
Phalloidin is a bicyclic heptapeptide containing an unusual cysteine-tryptophan linkage. The gene coding for synthesis of phalloidin is part of the MSDIN family in the Death Cap mushroom and codes for a 34 amino acid propeptide. A proline residue flanks the seven-residue region that will later become phalloidin. After translation, the peptide must be proteolyticly excised, cyclized, hydroxylated, Trp-Cys cross-linked to form tryptathionine, and epimerized to form a D-Thr. The order and exact biochemical mechanism for these steps is not yet fully understood. The current belief is that the necessary biosynthetic genes are clustered near the MSDIN genes.

The first post-translational modification of the 34-mer is proteolytic cleavage via a prolyl oligopeptidase (POP) to remove the 10-amino acid "leader" peptide. The POP then cyclizes the heptapeptide Ala-Trp-Leu-Ala-Thr-Cys-Pro by transpeptidation between amino acid 1 (Ala) and amino acid 7 (Pro). It is believed that the formation of tryptathionine through Trp-Cys cross-linking occurs next and is carried out by a different enzyme.

=== Chemical synthesis ===
Since phalloidin is exploited for its ability to bind and stabilize actin polymers but cells cannot readily uptake it, scientists have found phalloidin derivatives to be more useful in research. Essentially, it follows typical small peptide synthesis, using hydroxyl-proline. The major difficulty in synthesis is the formation of the tryptathionine bond (cysteine - tryptophan cross-linkage).

Below is the general synthetic mechanism carried out by Anderson et al. in 2005 for the solid phase synthesis of ala^{7}-phalloidin, which differs at residue 7 from phalloidin as indicated below. THPP stands for tetrahydropyranyl polystyrene linker, which is used to connect the molecule with the solid support during synthesis. Note that the synthesis below is simply a general scheme to show the order of bond formation to connect the starting materials. Ala^{7}-phalloidin as well as many other similar variants of phalloidin are useful to increase cell uptake relative to phalloidin and to attach a fluorophore to aid in the visualization of F-actin in microscopy.

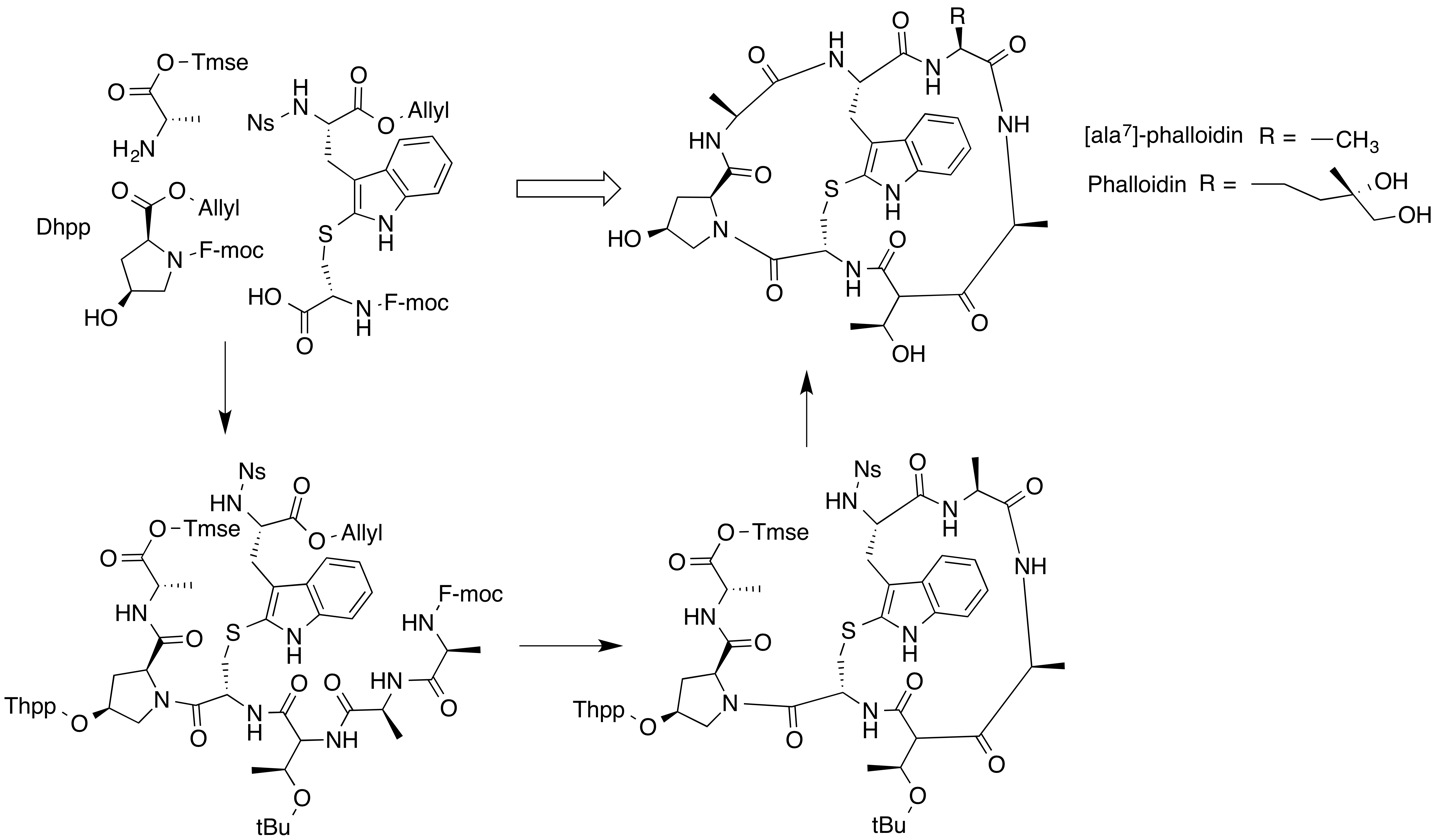
Phalloidin Synthetic Scheme

The first total synthesis of phalloidin was achieved through a combination of solid phase and solution phase synthesis (Baosheng Liu and Jianheng Zhang, United States Patent, US 8,569,452 B2). The physical and chemical properties of the synthetic phalloidin are the same as the naturally occurring phalloidin.

== Mechanism of action ==
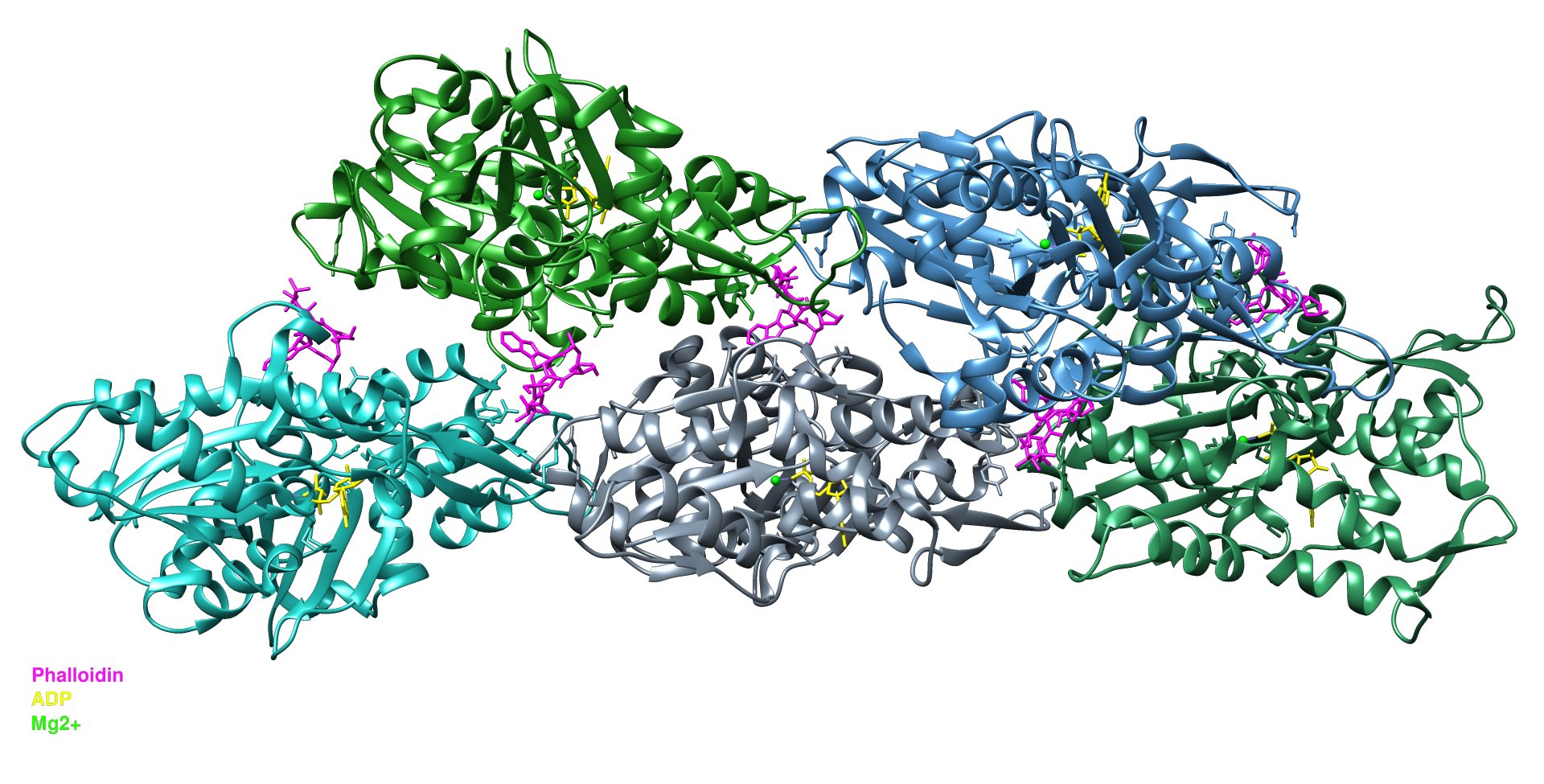
Cryo-EM structure of phalloidin-stabilized F-actin from 6T1Y

Phalloidin binds F-actin, preventing its depolymerization and poisoning the cell. Phalloidin binds specifically at the interface between F-actin subunits, locking adjacent subunits together. Phalloidin, a bicyclic heptapeptide, binds to actin filaments much more tightly than to actin monomers, leading to a decrease in the rate constant for the dissociation of actin subunits from filament ends, which essentially stabilizes actin filaments through the prevention of filament depolymerization. Moreover, phalloidin is found to inhibit the ATP hydrolysis activity of F-actin. Thus, phalloidin traps actin monomers in a conformation distinct from G-actin and it stabilizes the structure of F-actin by greatly reducing the rate constant for monomer dissociation, an event associated with the trapping of ADP. Overall, phalloidin is found to react stoichiometrically with actin, strongly promote actin polymerization, and stabilize actin polymers.

Phalloidin functions differently at various concentrations in cells. When introduced into the cytoplasm at low concentrations, phalloidin recruits the less polymerized forms of cytoplasmic actin as well as filamin into stable "islands" of aggregated actin polymers, yet it does not interfere with stress fibers, i.e. thick bundles of microfilaments. Wehland et al. also notes that at higher concentrations, phalloidin induces cellular contraction.

== Symptoms ==
Soon after its discovery, scientists injected phalloidin into mice and discovered its LD_{50} is 2 mg/kg via IP injection. When exposed to the minimum lethal dose, it took several days for these mice to die. The only apparent side effect of phalloidin poisoning is extreme hunger. This is because phalloidin is only taken up by the liver via bile salt membrane transport proteins. Once inside the liver, phalloidin binds F-actin, preventing its depolymerization. It takes time for this process to destroy the liver cells. The kidneys can also take up phalloidin, but not as effectively as the liver. Here, phalloidin causes nephrosis.

== Use as an imaging tool ==
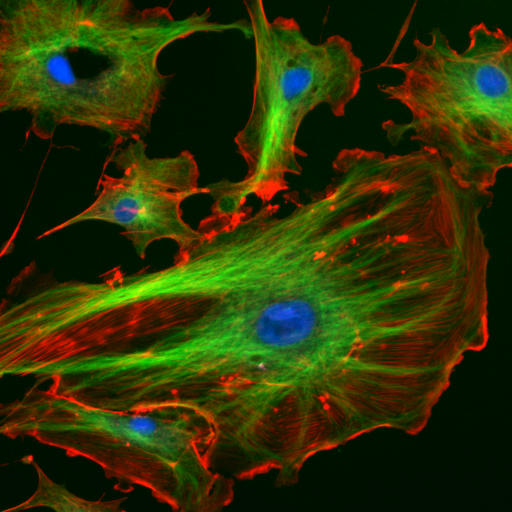
Fluorescent phalloidin (red) marking actin filaments in endothelial cells

The properties of phalloidin make it a useful tool for investigating the distribution of F-actin in cells by labeling phalloidin with fluorescent analogs and using them to stain actin filaments for light microscopy. Fluorescent derivatives of phalloidin have turned out to be enormously useful in localizing actin filaments in living or fixed cells as well as for visualizing individual actin filaments in vitro. A high-resolution technique was developed to detect F-actin at the light and electron microscopic levels by using phalloidin conjugated to the fluorophore eosin which acts as the fluorescent tag. In this method known as fluorescence photo-oxidation, fluorescent molecules can be utilized to drive the oxidation of diaminobenzidine (DAB) to create a reaction product that can be rendered electron dense and detectable by electron microscopy. The amount of fluorescence visualized can be used as a quantitative measure of the amount of filamentous actin there is in cells if saturating quantities of fluorescent phalloidin are used. Consequently, immunofluorescence microscopy along with microinjection of phalloidin can be used to evaluate the direct and indirect functions of cytoplasmic actin in its different stages of polymer formation. Therefore, fluorescent phalloidin can be used as an important tool in the study of actin networks at high resolution.

== Uses and limitations ==
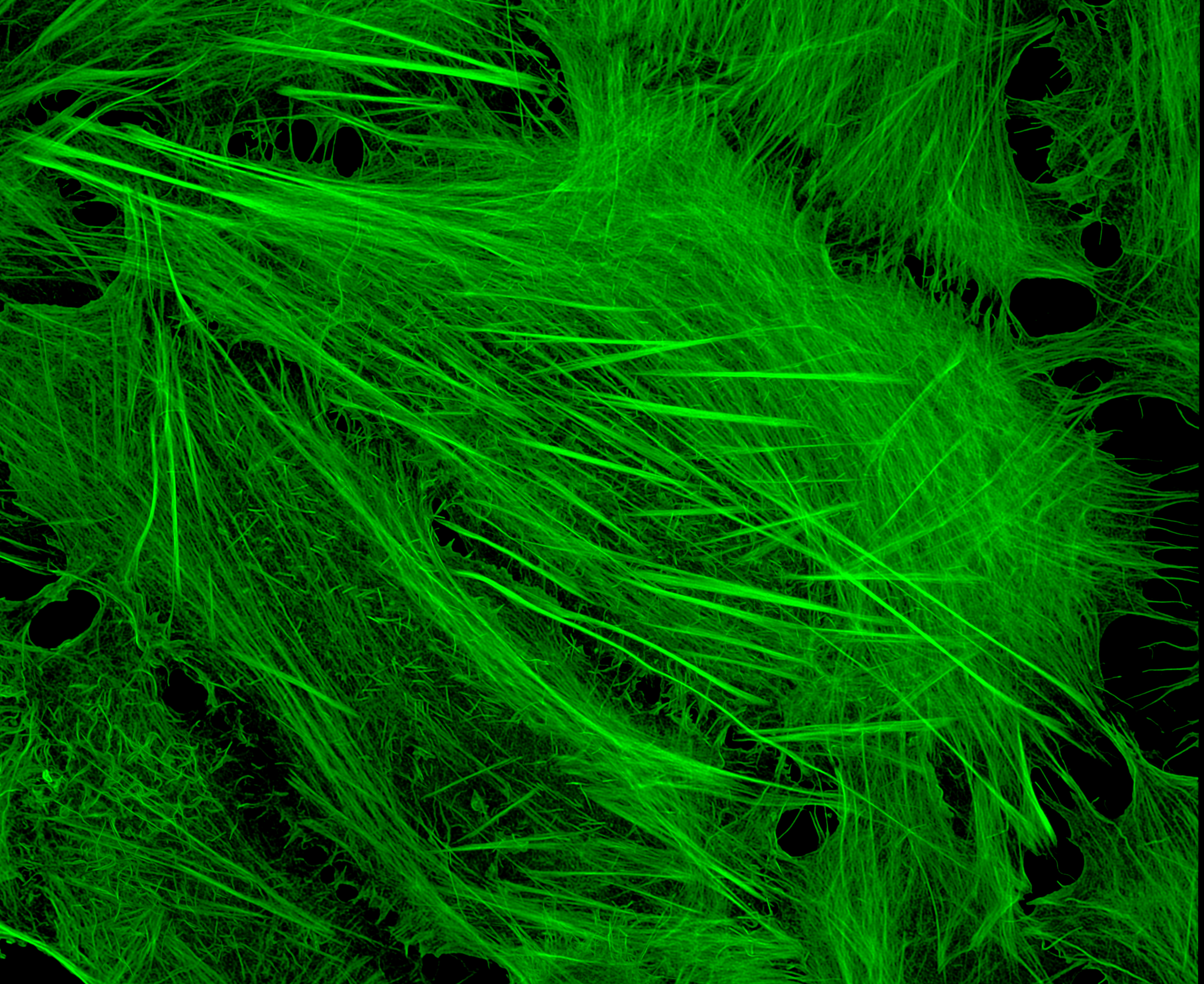
Deconvolution image of U2OS cells stained with fluorescent phalloidin taken on a confocal microscope

Phalloidin is much smaller than an antibody that would typically be used to label cellular proteins for fluorescent microscopy which allows for much denser labeling of filamentous actin and much more detailed images can be acquired particularly at higher resolutions.

Unmodified phalloidins do not permeate cell membranes, making them less effective in experiments with living cells. Derivatives of phalloidin with greatly increased cell permeability have been synthesized.

Cells treated with phalloidins exhibit a number of toxic effects and frequently die. Furthermore, phalloidin-treated cells will have greater levels of actin associated with their plasma membranes, and the microinjection of phalloidin into living cells will change actin distribution as well as cell motility.

== See also ==
- Cytoskeleton
