= Phallotoxin =

Group of chemical compounds

The phallotoxins consist of at least seven compounds, all of which are bicyclic heptapeptides (seven amino acids), isolated from the death cap mushroom (Amanita phalloides). They differ from the closely related amatoxins by being one residue smaller, both in the final product and the precursor protein.

Phalloidin had been isolated in 1937 by Feodor Lynen, Heinrich Wieland's student and son-in-law, and Ulrich Wieland of LMU Munich. The remaining six are prophalloin, phalloin, phallisin, phallacidin, phallacin, and phallisacin. Though highly toxic to liver cells, phallotoxins have since been found to have little contribution to the death cap's toxicity because they are not absorbed through the gut. Reports of phalloidin in the edible and sought after blusher (Amanita rubescens) have not been confirmed by later researchers.

== Chemical structures ==
Phalloidin

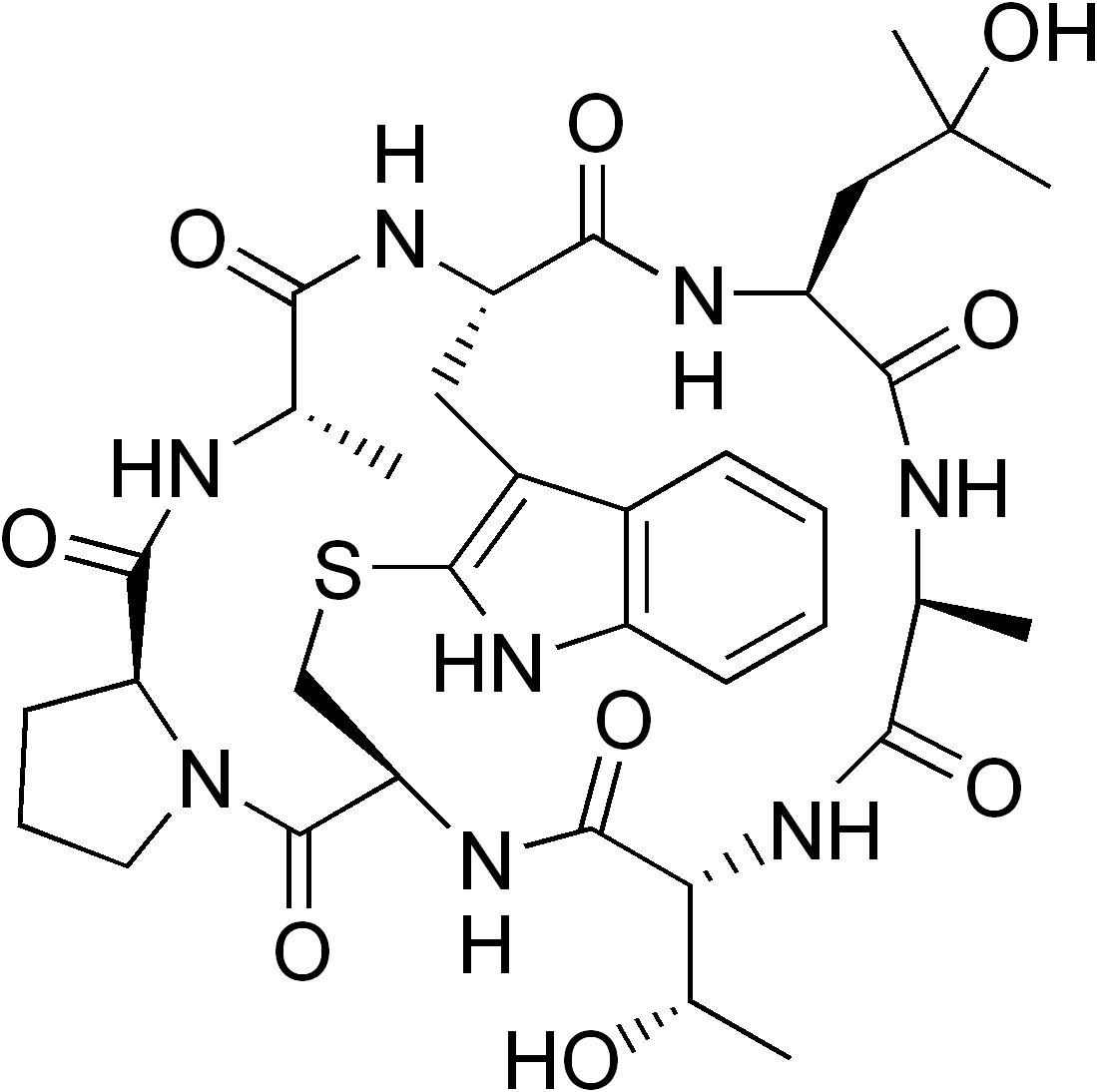
Prophalloin

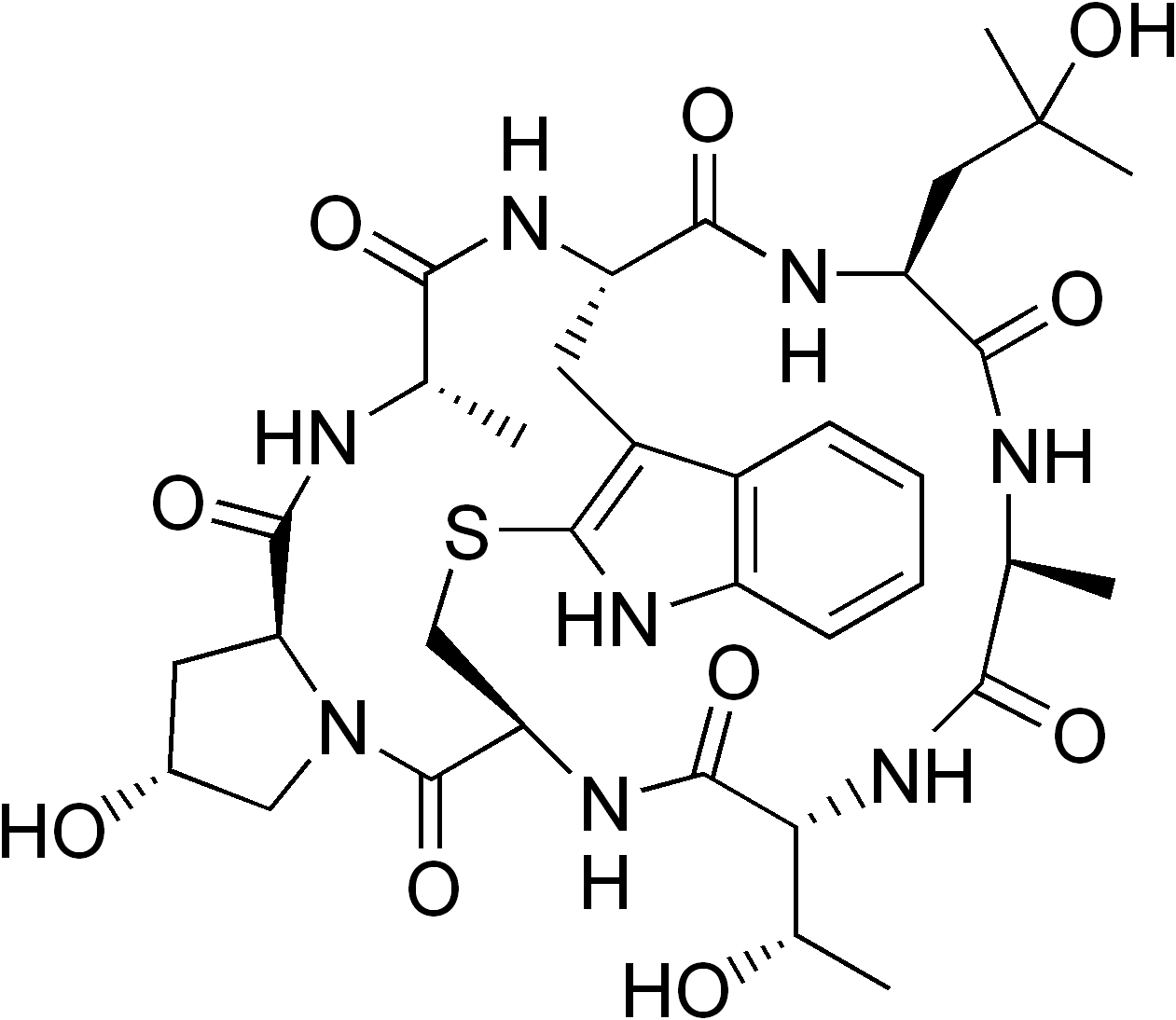
Phalloin

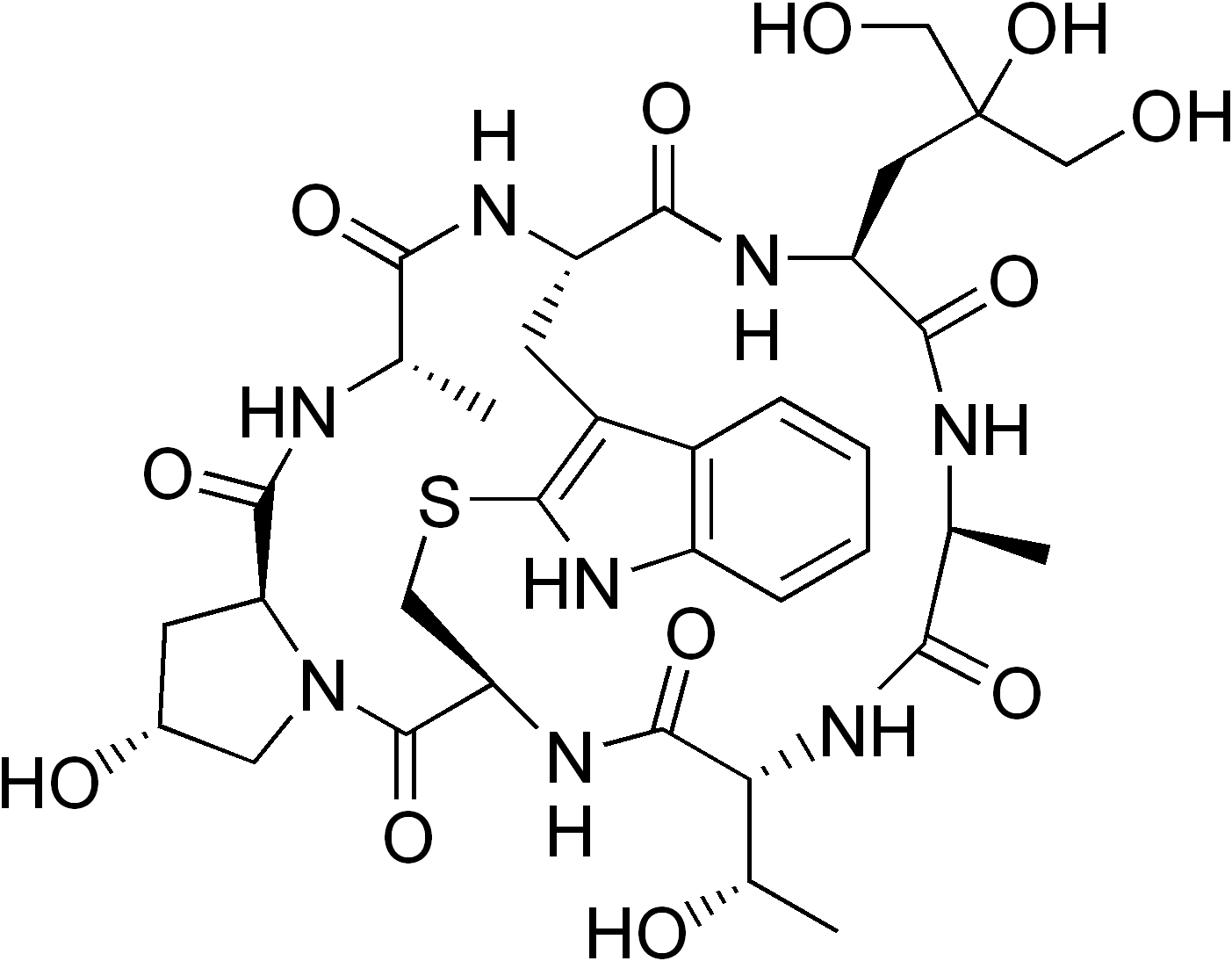
Phallisin

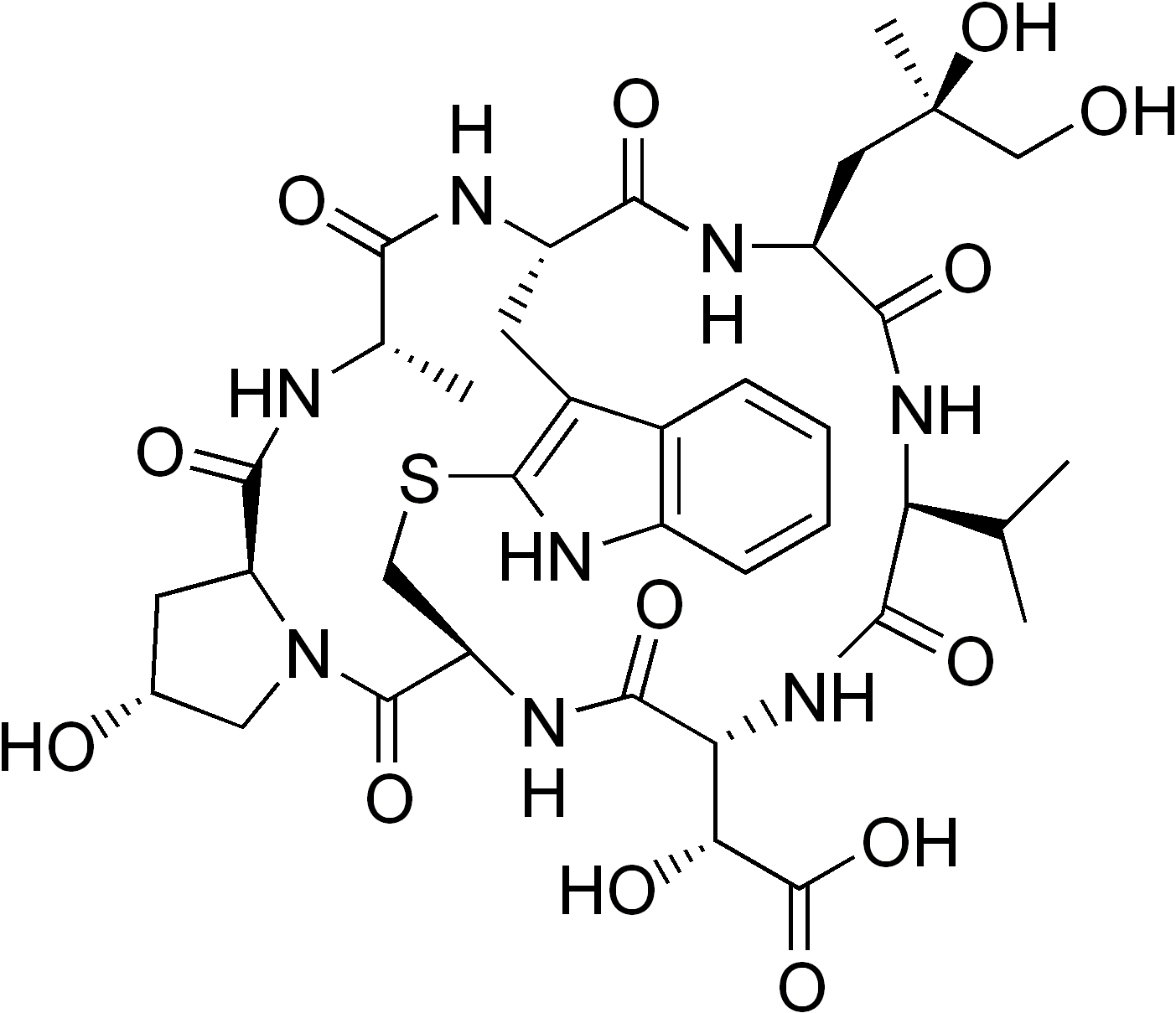
Phallacidin

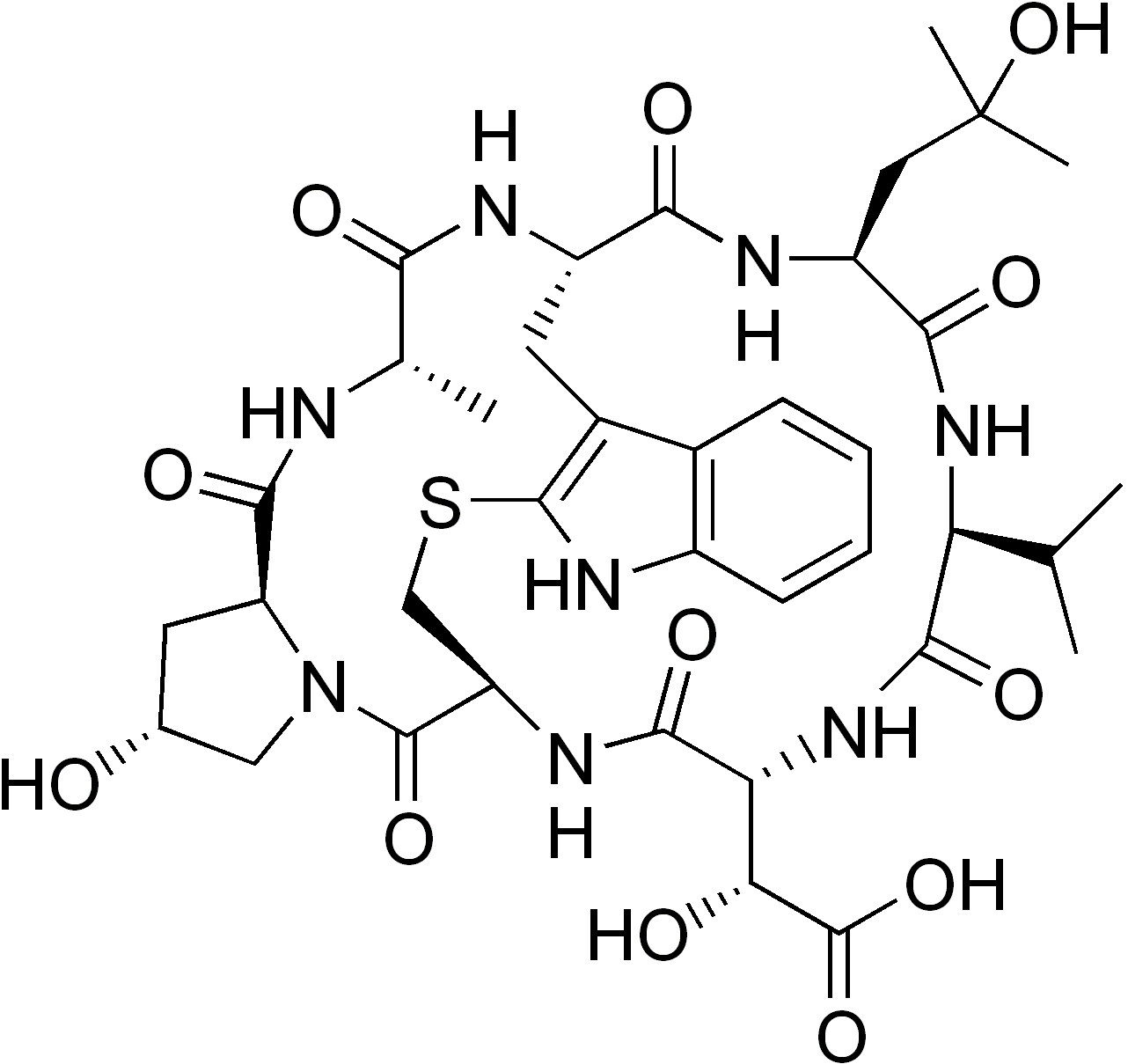
Phallacin

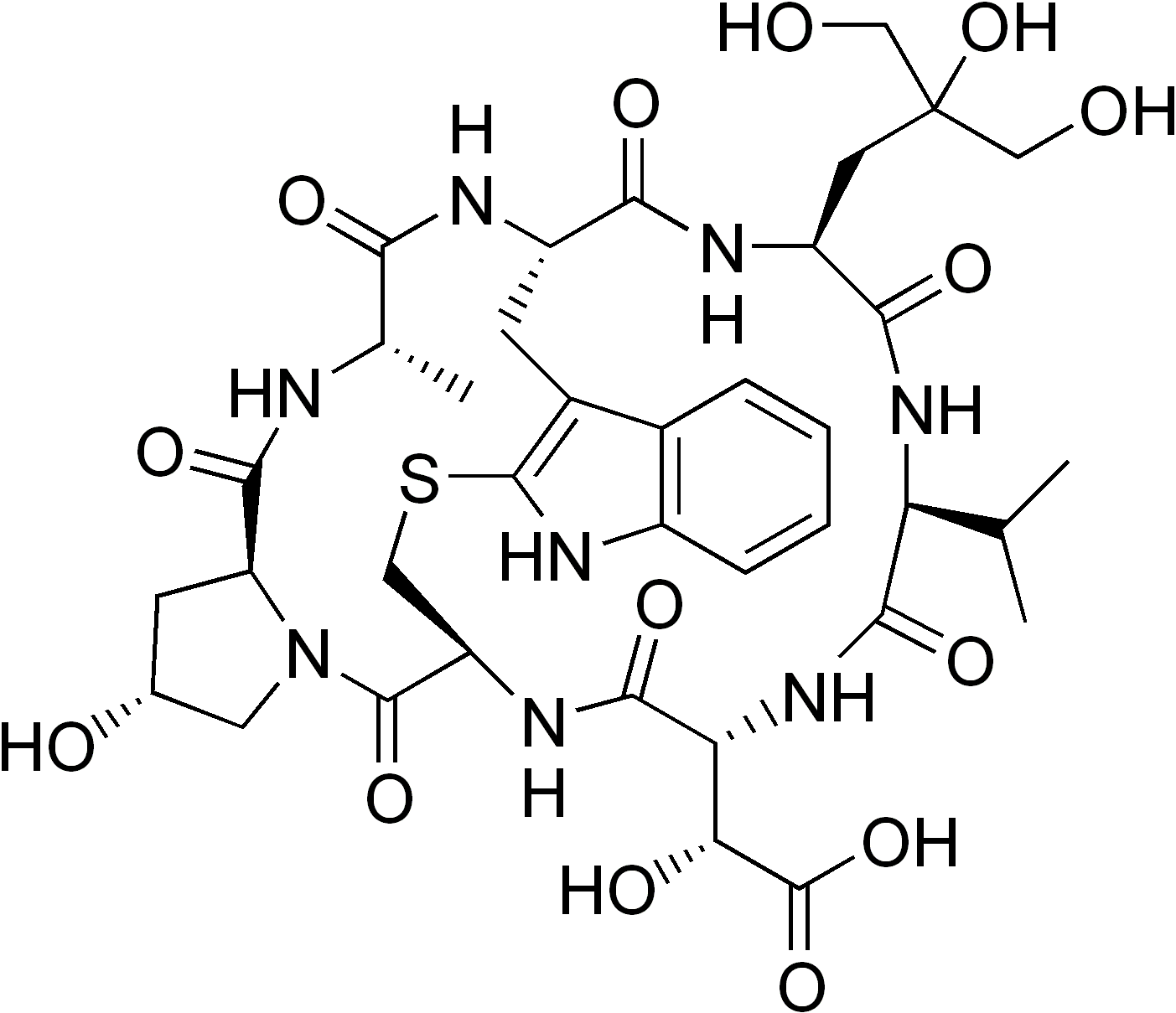
Phallisacin
