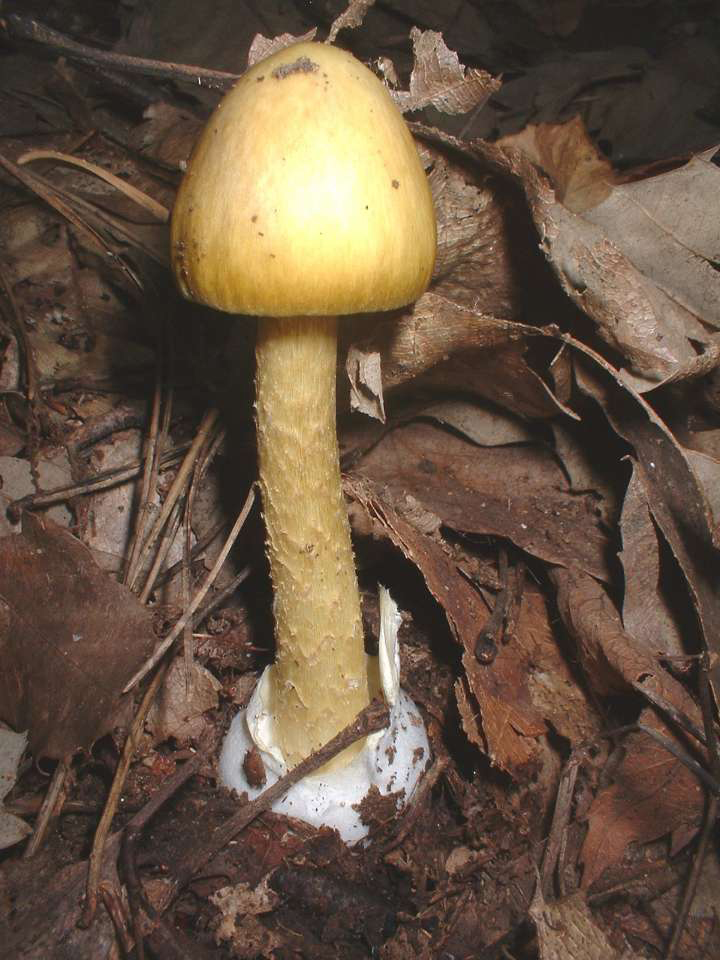

Scientific classification
- Kingdom: Fungi
- Division: Basidiomycota
- Class: Agaricomycetes
- Order: Agaricales
- Family: Amanitaceae
- Genus: Amanita
- Species: A. subjunquillea

Binomial name
- Amanita subjunquillea S. Imai (1933)

= Amanita subjunquillea =

East Asian Death cap

Species of fungus

Amanita subjunquillea
- Mycological characteristics
- Gills on hymenium
- Cap is convex
- Hymenium is free
- Stipe has a ring and volva
- Spore print is white
- Ecology is mycorrhizal
- Edibility is deadly

Amanita subjunquillea, also known as the East Asian death cap, is a mushroom of the large genus Amanita, which occurs in East and Southeast Asia. Potentially deadly if ingested, it is closely related to the death cap A. phalloides.

Initially little reported, the toxicity of A. subjunquillea has been well established; a study in Korea revealed it to have similar effects to A. phalloides, namely delayed gastrointestinal symptoms, hepatotoxicity, and a 12.5% mortality. The species killed five people out of six who ingested them in Hebei, China, in 1994.

An all-white variety, Amanita subjunquillea var. alba is known from southwestern China, Japan, and Northern India.

== See also ==
- List of Amanita species
- List of deadly fungus species
