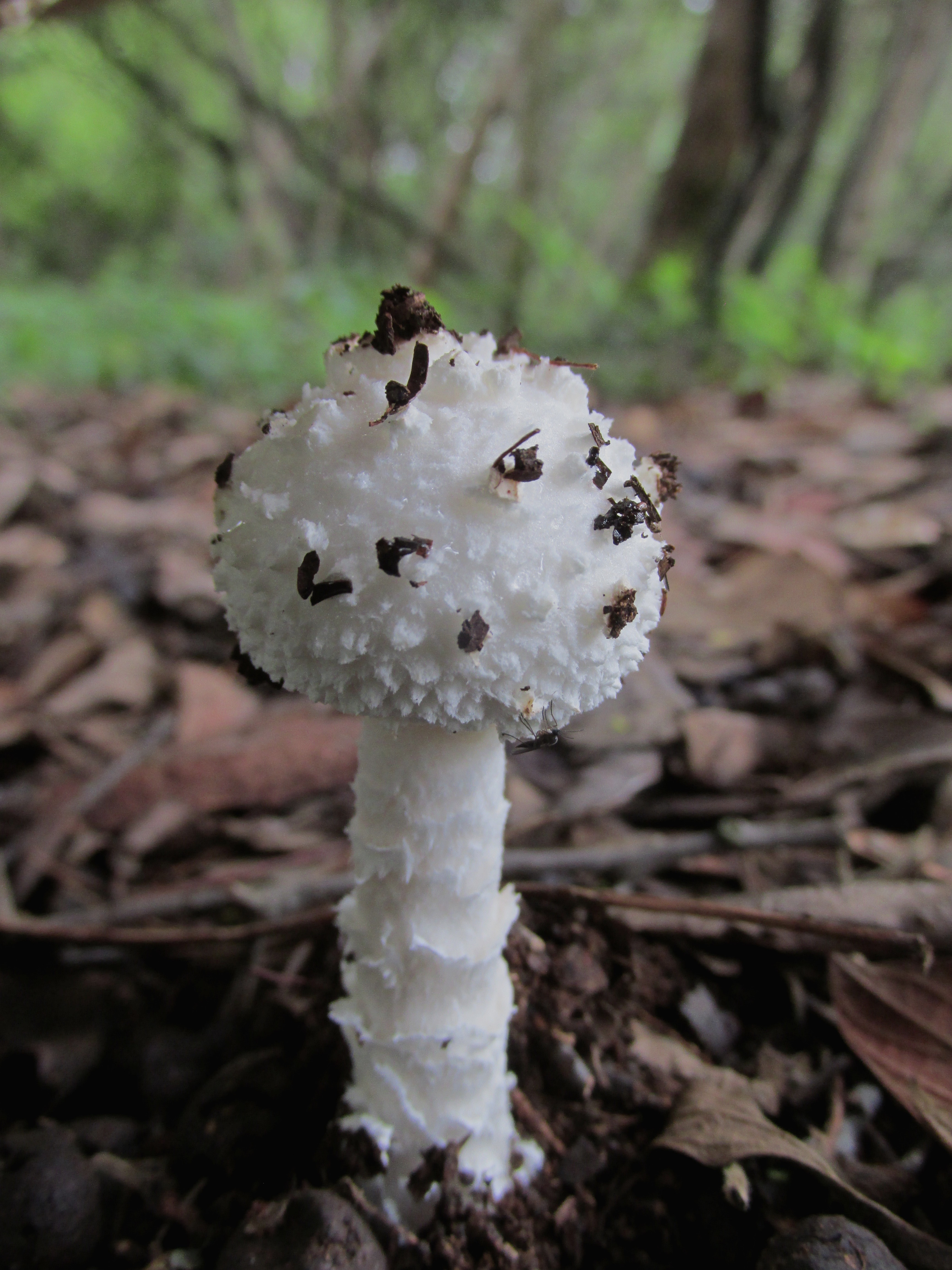

Scientific classification
- Kingdom: Fungi
- Division: Basidiomycota
- Class: Agaricomycetes
- Order: Agaricales
- Family: Amanitaceae
- Genus: Amanita
- Species: A. veldiei

Binomial name
- Amanita veldiei D. A. Reid & Eicker ex Redhead 2016

= Amanita veldiei =

Species of fungus

Amanita veldiei
- Mycological characteristics
- Gills on hymenium
- Cap is convex or flat
- Hymenium is free
- Stipe has a volva
- Spore print is white
- Ecology is saprotrophic
- Edibility is unknown

Amanita veldiei is a species of Amanita found in South Africa and Zambia. It grows singly, grouped, or in fairy rings, under broadleaved trees. The diameter of the cap is 4-6 cm. The cap is covered with whitish warts, which are remnants from its veil. Gills are cream colored, narrow and free. The stipe is 0.6-1.1 cm thick and 12.5-13 cm long. Its stipe is also coated in volval remnants, white fibrillose warts and delicate fibers, below the ring, most notably around its bulbous base. Spore print is white. This mushroom has no prominent odour. Similar species include Amanita hesleri, found in the United States, and Amanita zangii, from China. Edibility is unknown.
