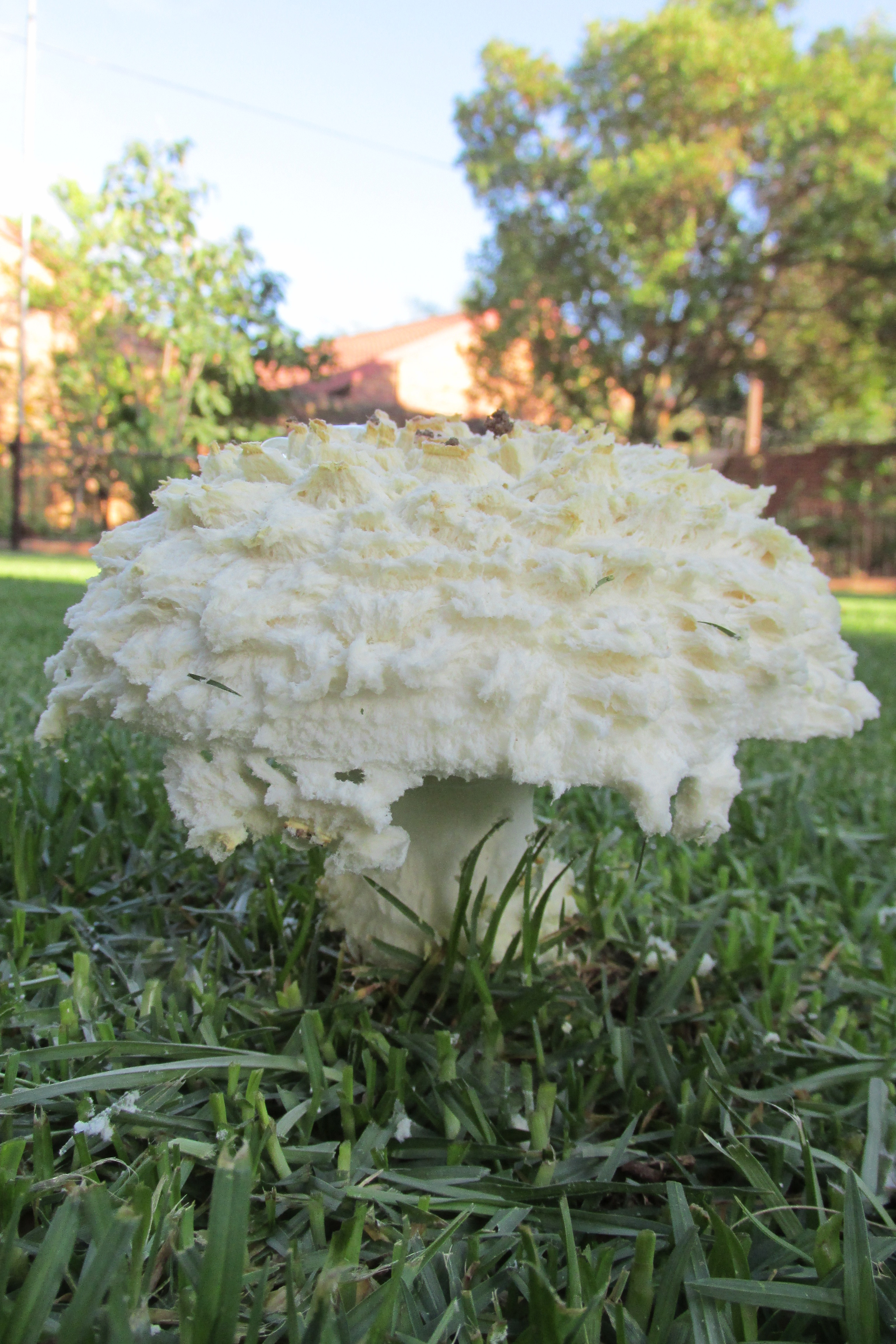

Scientific classification
- Kingdom: Fungi
- Division: Basidiomycota
- Class: Agaricomycetes
- Order: Agaricales
- Family: Amanitaceae
- Genus: Saproamanita
- Species: S. praeclara

Binomial name
- Saproamanita praeclara (A.Pearson) Redhead, Vizzini, Drehmel & Contu

Synonyms
- Amanita praeclara (A.Pearson) Bas; Aspidella praeclara (A.Pearson) Vizzini & Contu; Lepiota praeclara A.Pearson; Macrolepiota praeclara

= Saproamanita praeclara =

Saproamanita praeclara
- Mycological characteristics
- Gills on hymenium
- Cap is conical or convex
- Hymenium is free
- Spore print is white
- Ecology is saprotrophic
- Edibility is unknown

Saproamanita praeclara, or the playing field lepidella, is a species fungus found exclusively in South Africa thus far, indicating that it could be native. It is easily identified by the felt-like tufts on its stipe and cap. In older specimens warts or tougher patches appear on the cap. Usually this mushroom grows in fairy rings. Similar species include the Saproamanita thiersii, a poisonous mushroom found in the United States.

== Description ==
Saproamanita praeclara is a robust, white mushroom. The cap is 1–9.5 centimetres (1/2–3 3/4 inches) in diameter. It is white with lemony yellow tinges. The cap starts off conical and hairless, but becomes convex and loosely hairy with time. It is sometimes slightly dented and hairless at the center. The margins of the cap are shaggy and hang down towards the stem. The cap has a strong very noticeable scent.

The solid stem is 11–13 cm (4 1/2–5 in) long. It ranges from white to lemony yellow in colour. It becomes bulbous towards the base and is powdery and hairy near the top. It has a soapy scent.

The ring is hairy. The gills are free, deep and crowded. They are white or cream coloured when the organism is young and become yellow with age. The spore print is white.

== Distribution and habitat ==
S. praeclara grows in Western Cape and Gauteng provinces of South Africa. It grows in rings in grassy areas (such as fields and lawns) and near woods.
