= Saproamanita foetidissima =

- Image by Glenn Van Niekerk at Mushroom Observer

Scientific classification
- Kingdom: Fungi
- Division: Basidiomycota
- Class: Agaricomycetes
- Order: Agaricales
- Family: Amanitaceae
- Genus: Saproamanita
- Species: S. foetidissima

Binomial name
- Saproamanita foetidissima (D.A. Reid & Eicker) Redhead, Vizzini, Drehmel & Contu

Synonyms
- Amanita foetidissima

Saproamanita foetidissima
- Mycological characteristics
- Gills on hymenium
- Cap is convex or conical
- Hymenium is free
- Stipe has a ring
- Spore print is white
- Edibility is unknown

Saproamanita foetidissima, also known as Amanita foetidissima, or the stinker lepidella, is a mushroom found in South Africa. It is suspected that it is native to the country. S. foetidissima has also been found in parts of North America and South America, Australia, as well as Zambia. It grows singly or in groups and is found in grass-covered areas.

== Description ==
Saproamanita foetidissima is easily distinguished by its cream to brownish scaly cap. The diameter of the cap measures between 0.45-12 cm. In younger specimens, the cap may appear conical, while when older, the cap is convex. The stipe has warts as well, has a ring, and is bulbous at the base. Length of the stipe is 9-12 cm. Gills have a pinkish tint, ranging from a cream to white color, and are free. Similar species include Saproamanita nauseosa and Amanita species. S. foetidissima has a smell similar to urine, which differentiates it from other species.
