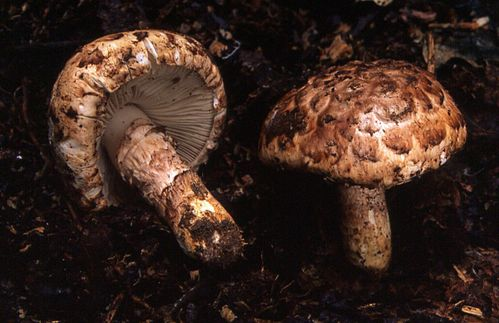

Scientific classification
- Kingdom: Fungi
- Division: Basidiomycota
- Class: Agaricomycetes
- Order: Agaricales
- Family: Amanitaceae
- Genus: Amanita
- Species: A. codinae

Binomial name
- Amanita codinae (Maire) Bertault

Synonyms
- Saproamanita codinae

= Amanita codinae =

Species of mushroom

Amanita codinae is a species of mushroom in the genus Amanita.

Amanita codinae is found in the Mediterranean and has a whitish to pale brownish cap, a white gill that turns yellowish as it ages, and a short, scaly stem. It is edible, though it is similar to Amanita vittadinii.
