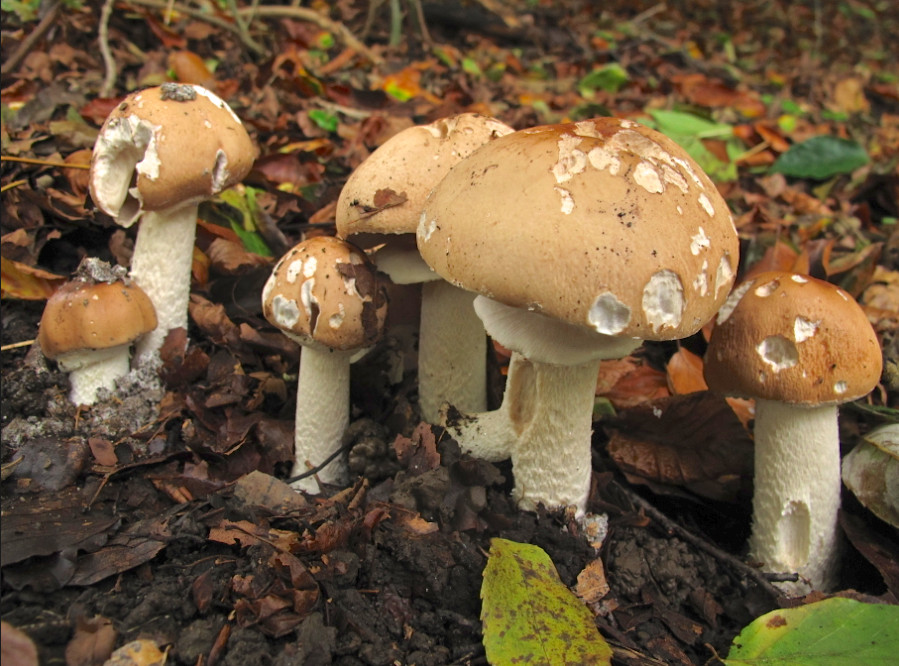

Scientific classification
- Kingdom: Fungi
- Division: Basidiomycota
- Class: Agaricomycetes
- Order: Agaricales
- Family: Amanitaceae
- Genus: Limacella
- Species: L. guttata

Binomial name
- Limacella guttata (Pers.) Konrad & Maubl. (1949)

Synonyms
- Agaricus guttatus Pers. (1793)

= Limacella guttata =

Species of fungus

Limacella guttata is a mushroom-forming fungus in the family Amanitaceae. Limacella guttata is found in Europe and North America, where it grows in damp woodlands typically dominated by deciduous plants such as ash, beech, and elm. The specific epithet guttata is derived from Latin, meaning "with droplets".
