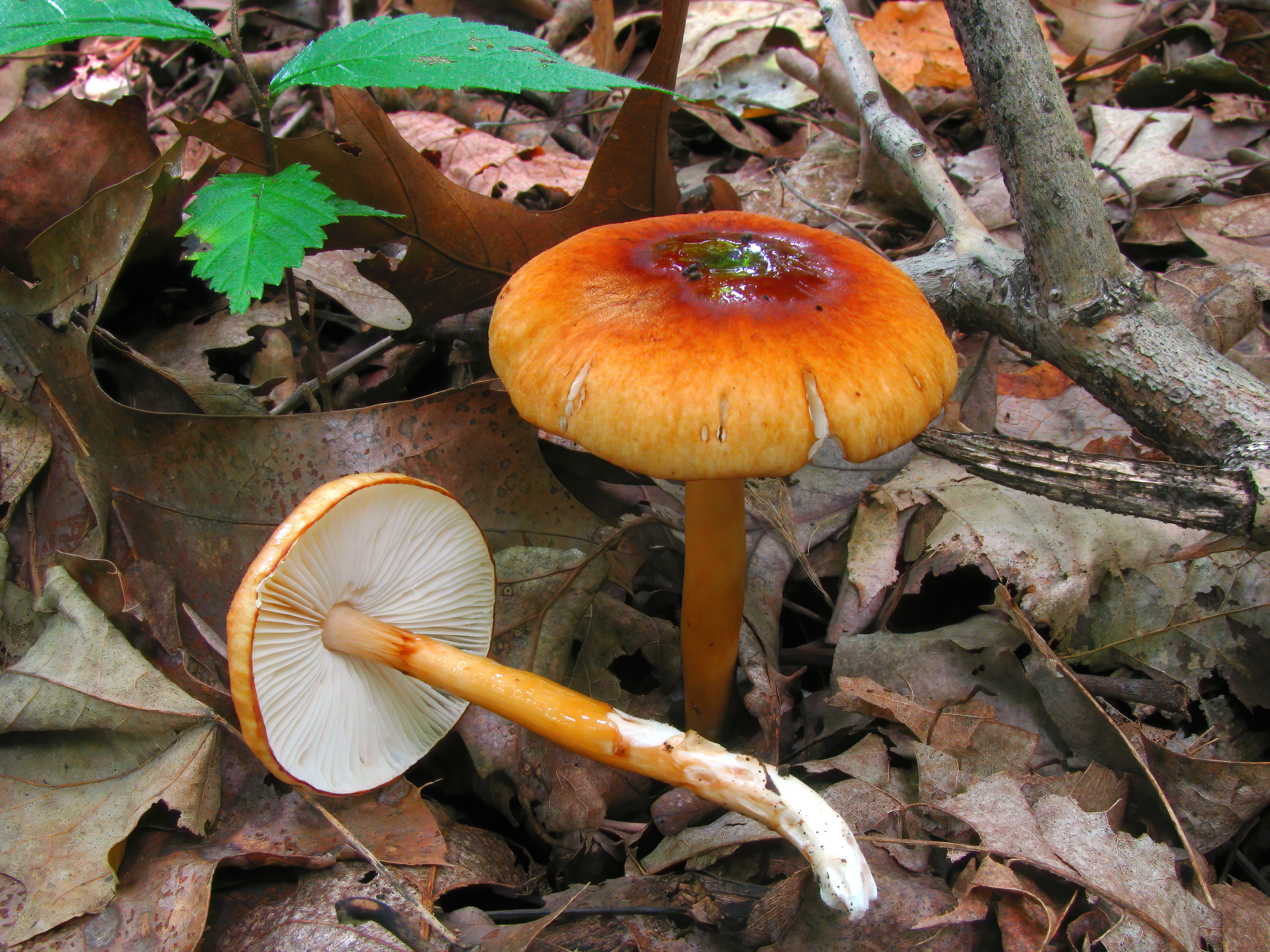

Scientific classification
- Domain: Eukaryota
- Kingdom: Fungi
- Division: Basidiomycota
- Class: Agaricomycetes
- Order: Agaricales
- Family: Amanitaceae
- Genus: Limacella
- Species: L. glischra

Binomial name
- Limacella glischra (Morgan) Murrill (1914)

Synonyms
- Lepiota glischra Morgan (1906)

= Limacella glischra =

Species of fungus

Limacella glischra is a mushroom species in the family Amanitaceae. It was first named as a species of Lepiota by Andrew Price Morgan in 1906; William Alphonso Murrill transferred it to Limacella in 1914.
