= Orbea (disambiguation) =

Orbea is a Spanish bicycle manufacturer.

Orbea may also refer to:

- Artiach (cycling team), known as Orbea in 1984 and 1985
- Euskadi (Continental cycling team), known as Orbea between 2005 and 2012
- Orbea (plant), a genus of flowering plants native to Africa
