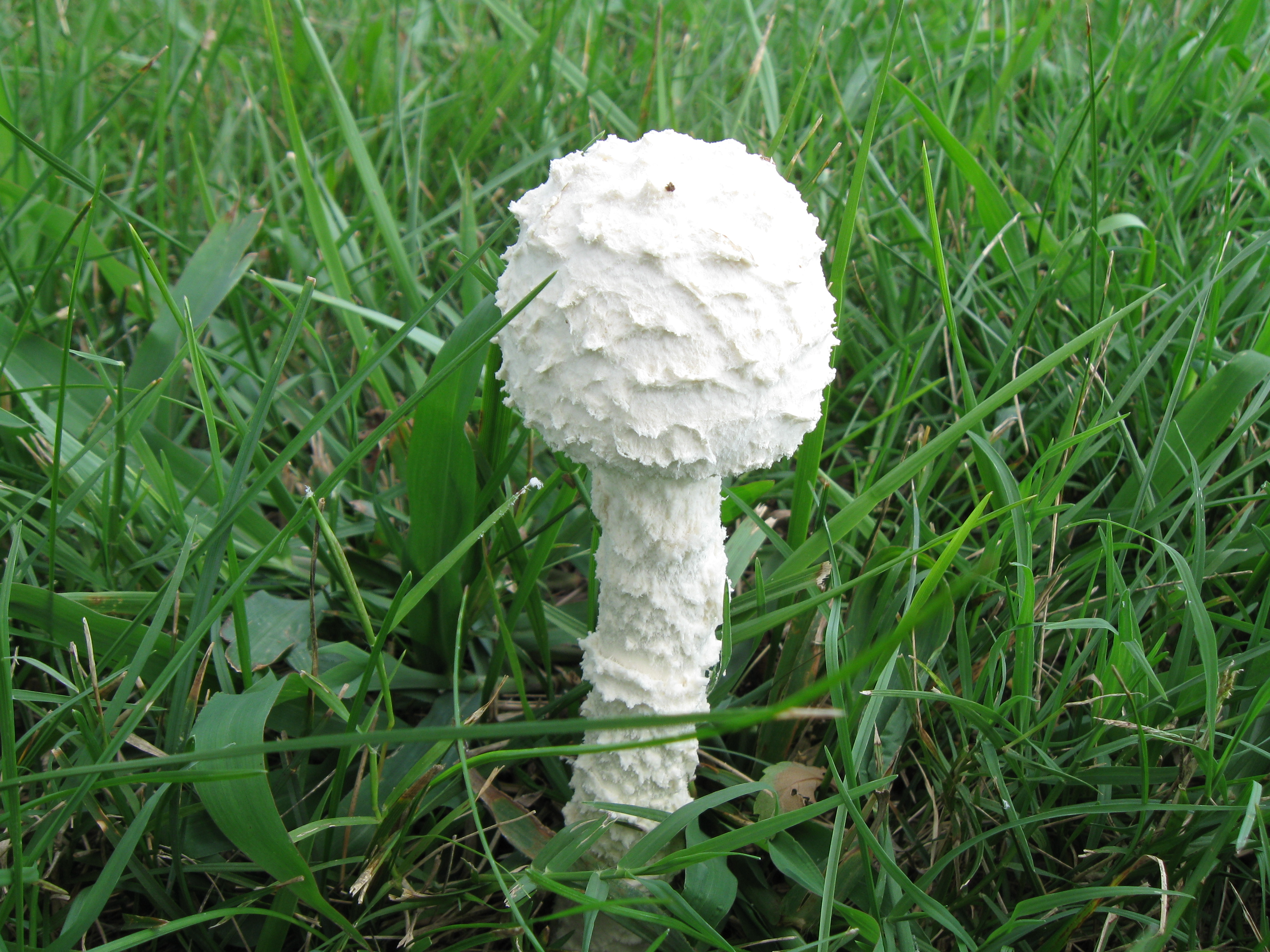

Scientific classification
- Domain: Eukaryota
- Kingdom: Fungi
- Division: Basidiomycota
- Class: Agaricomycetes
- Order: Agaricales
- Family: Amanitaceae
- Genus: Saproamanita
- Species: S. thiersii

Binomial name
- Saproamanita thiersii (Bas) Redhead, Vizzini, Drehmel & Contu (2016)

Synonyms
- Amanita thiersii Bas (1969); Amanita alba Thiers (1957)

= Saproamanita thiersii =

Species of fungus

Saproamanita thiersii Mycological characteristics
- Gills on hymenium
- Cap is convex
- Hymenium is free
- Stipe has a ring and volva
- Spore print is white
- Ecology is saprotrophic
- Edibility is poisonous

Saproamanita thiersii (formerly Amanita thiersii), commonly called Thiers' lepidella, is a North American saprotrophic basidiomycete fungus in the genus Saproamanita. It is a white, small mushroom. Its cap is convex, measuring 3.5–10 centimetres (1 1/2–4 inches) across, and the stipe is 8–20 cm (3–8 in) long. The spore print is white.

Originally described from Texas but today found in ten states of North America, the mushroom grows in lawns, pastures and prairies. It is a saprotroph, living on decaying plant material, and not mycorrhizal as is the case with species of Amanita, where it was previously placed. Fruit bodies appear during July and August, either in isolation or in groups, and often form fairy rings. A genome sequencing project aims to study the cellulose decomposition capabilities of the fungus. It is probably poisonous.

== Taxonomy ==
Sapromanita thiersii was first described in 1957 by American mycologist Harry Delbert Thiers, who had spotted it on a campus lawn when he was a student. He named it Amanita alba but that name was disallowed as it had already been used for another species. In 1969 it was renamed by the Dutch mycologist Cornelis Bas as Amanita thiersii in honour of its finder. It used to be placed in the genus Amanita in the section Lepidella and subsection Vittadiniae. Bas created the stirps (an informal ranking below species level) Thiersii, in which he placed S. thiersii along with A. albofloccosa, A. aureofloccosa, A. foetens and A. praeclara. The mushroom is commonly called "Thiers' lepidella".

Then in 2016 Scott Redhead and his associates created the genus Saproamanita for the saprophytic members of Amanita (sensu largo) but the new name Saproamanita thiersii is very controversial and not broadly accepted.

== Description ==
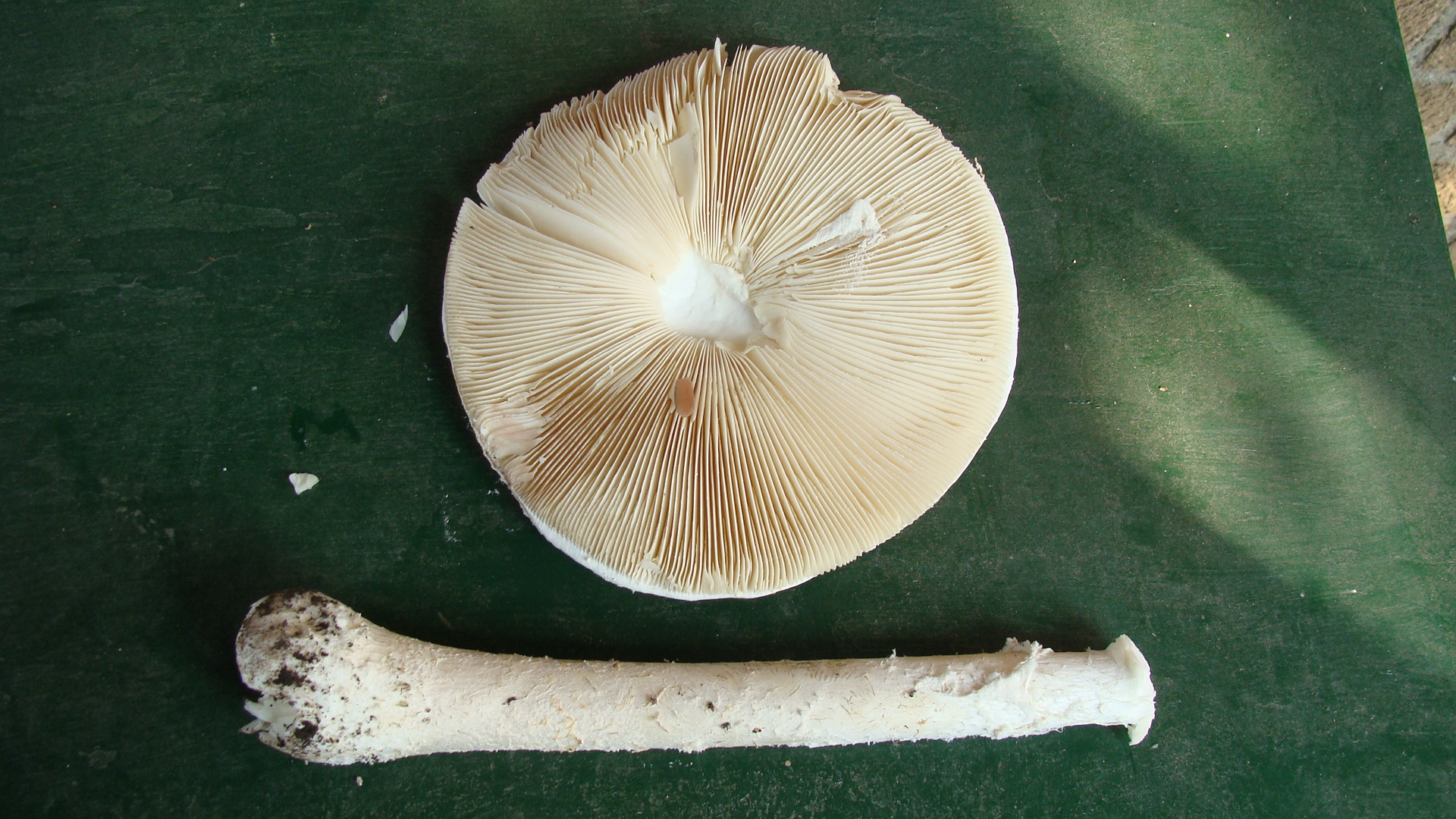
Stipe and cap of the mushroom

The cap is white and dry, measuring 3.5–10 centimetres (1 1/2–4 inches) wide, and convex in shape (conico- or plano-convex). It often has a broad low umbo. The cap's flesh may be 10 millimetres (1/2 in) thick. At first the cap is covered by the soft, white fragmentary remains of the universal veil, which become more widely separated as the cap expands. They are shaggy and somewhat sticky.

The gills are of varying lengths. They are free from the stipe and vary from crowded to widely spaced. They may be narrow or broad and are white to creamy yellow in color. The stipe is white and is 8–20 cm (3–8 in) long and 10–20 mm (1/2–3/4 in) wide. In some specimens, the stipe bruises to a yellow color. It is either hollow or lightly stuffed with a cottony tissue. The bulb at the base is slightly broader than the rest of the stipe. The bulb is 2.5 cm (1 in) long and 2.2 cm (7/8 in) wide. A shaggy, drooping ring is present which is often shed before maturity.

Spores of S. thiersii are white and roughly spherical. They measure approximately 7.8–9.8 by 7.3–9.0 μm and are amyloid. In an analysis, both monokaryotic (one nucleus per cell) and dikaryotic (two nuclei per cell) strains were isolated from fruit bodies. All the spores were found to be binucleate but the researchers believed that in the monokaryotic strain, the second nucleus had failed to pass through the germ tube.

The odor of this mushroom is indistinct but with age can become unpleasant, like that of decay or cheese. The fungus is said to taste oily bitter or bitter metallic.

=== Identification ===
S. thiersii may be gathered inadvertently and thought to be edible due to the fact that it grows on lawns among grasses. This is in contrast to Amanita species, which grow around trees and are thus usually seen in forests. It can be distinguished from other white fungi growing in grassland by its fluffy cap, though the white veil fragments may eventually get washed away by rain.

It is similar in appearance to a number of Amanita species. It can be distinguished from A. praegraveolens microscopically by the absence of clamp connections between the cells in S. thiersii. Both S. thiersii and A. aureofloccosa have hollow stems but the latter has a more tapering stipe and the whole fruit body is yellower. A. silvifuga is another species that grows in similar locations in grassland in Texas and H. D. Thiers described the taste of both it and A. thiersii as being bitter. It can be distinguished by its darker coloration and more warted appearance.

== Distribution and habitat ==
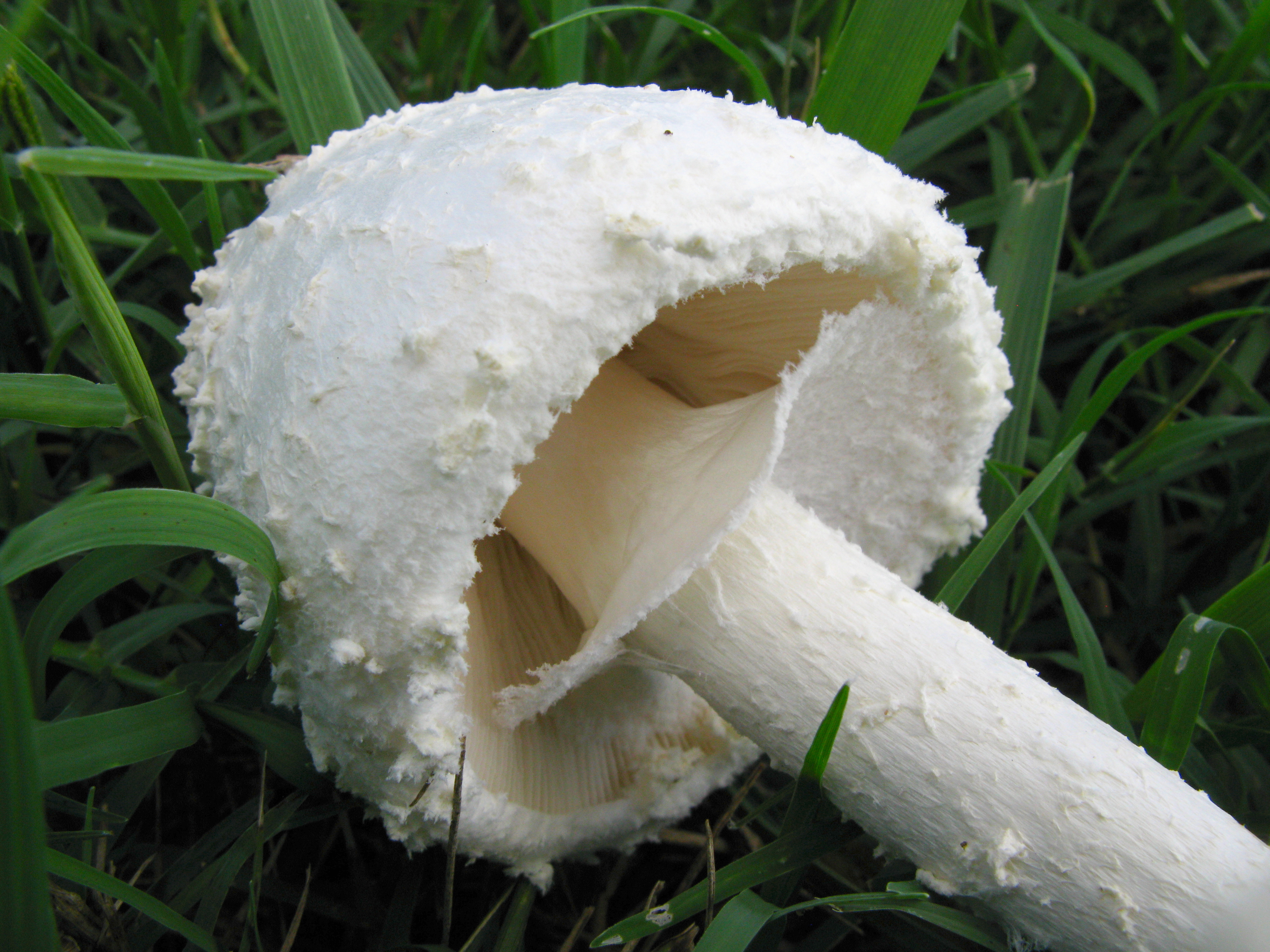
A specimen of S. thiersii

Saproamanita thiersii inhabits lawns, pastures and prairies throughout the Mississippi River Basin. It often forms fairy rings or arcs but also sometimes fruits as isolated specimens. It has been found growing in the same lawn as Chlorophyllum molybdites. Analysis using stable carbon isotopes has proved that this mushroom is saprotrophic in nature, unlike the other mycorrhizal Amanitas.

The fruit bodies of S. thiersii grow during the mid or late summer until early fall. Since it was first reported in 1952 in Texas, this species has been expanding its range. It appeared in southern Illinois in the 1990s and has since spread to central Illinois, where it is the most common mushroom found in lawns during July and August. Today it occurs in nine states including Missouri, Oklahoma, Texas, Kentucky, Ohio, Kansas, Iowa, Indiana, Illinois. It also occurs in Mexico.

== Genome project ==
The main source from which S. thiersii derives its carbon is the cellulose of the decomposing plant material found in its grassland habitat. The enzymes that degrade cellulose are homologous to the enzymes used by ectomycorrhizal fungi that have symbiotic associations with plant roots. In an attempt to identify the genes involved in these processes, researchers at the United States Department of Energy and University of Wisconsin are jointly working to sequence the S. thiersii genome and to compare it with that of Amanita bisporigera, a species which forms mycorrhizal relationships with tree and which has already been partly sequenced. They hope to better understand the genetic pathways involved in the evolution of ectomycorrhizal associations. Another research objective is to establish whether the enzymes used by S. thiersii to degrade cellulose can be cost-effectively used in the conversion of crop residues into biofuels. S. thiersii seems to be expanding its range northwards and its genome may provide clues as to how it is adapting to climate change and further information on mycorrhizal relationships.

This research has shown that there was a single origin of ectomycorrhizal symbiosis in the genus Amanita. DNA analysis has shown that a group of species in the subsection Vittadiniae (which includes S. thiersii) has few derived characteristics. This clade has a single ancestor (or a very small number) and seems to have come into being at a very early stage in the evolution of the genus.

== Toxicity ==
The species is suspected of being toxic as is the case in most of its close relatives. Handling the mushroom is harmless; poisoning occurs only on ingestion. A case of poisoning that may have been caused by S. thiersii has been reported from the state of Puebla, Mexico. The outcome of this case is unknown. Symptoms of poisoning in humans include reversible impairment of kidney function. A Meixner test revealed that amatoxins were not involved in the Puebla case. The species is harvested in Mexico under the Spanish name hongos de neblina.

== See also ==
- List of Amanita species
