= Limacella bangladeshana =

Scientific classification
- Domain: Eukaryota
- Kingdom: Fungi
- Division: Basidiomycota
- Class: Agaricomycetes
- Order: Agaricales
- Family: Amanitaceae
- Genus: Limacella
- Species: L. bangladeshana

Binomial name
- Limacella bangladeshana Iqbal Hosen (2017)

Species of fungus

Limacella bangladeshana is a species of the fungal family Amanitaceae. It is the first Limacella species reported from Bangladesh.
