= Modesciadium =

Scientific classification
- Kingdom: Plantae
- Clade: Tracheophytes
- Clade: Angiosperms
- Clade: Eudicots
- Clade: Asterids
- Order: Apiales
- Family: Apiaceae
- Subfamily: Apioideae
- Tribe: Pyramidoptereae
- Genus: Modesciadium; P.Vargas & Jim.Mejías
- Species: M. involucratum

Binomial name
- Modesciadium involucratum (Maire) P.Vargas & Jim.Mejías

Synonyms
- Brachyapium involucratum (Maire) Maire; Stoibrax involucratum (Maire) B.L.Burtt; Trachyspermum involucratum Maire (1922) (basionym); Tragiopsis involucrata (Maire) H.Wolff

Genus of flowering plants

Modesciadium is a genus of flowering plants in the family Apiaceae. It includes a single species, Modesciadium involucratum, which is endemic to Morocco.
