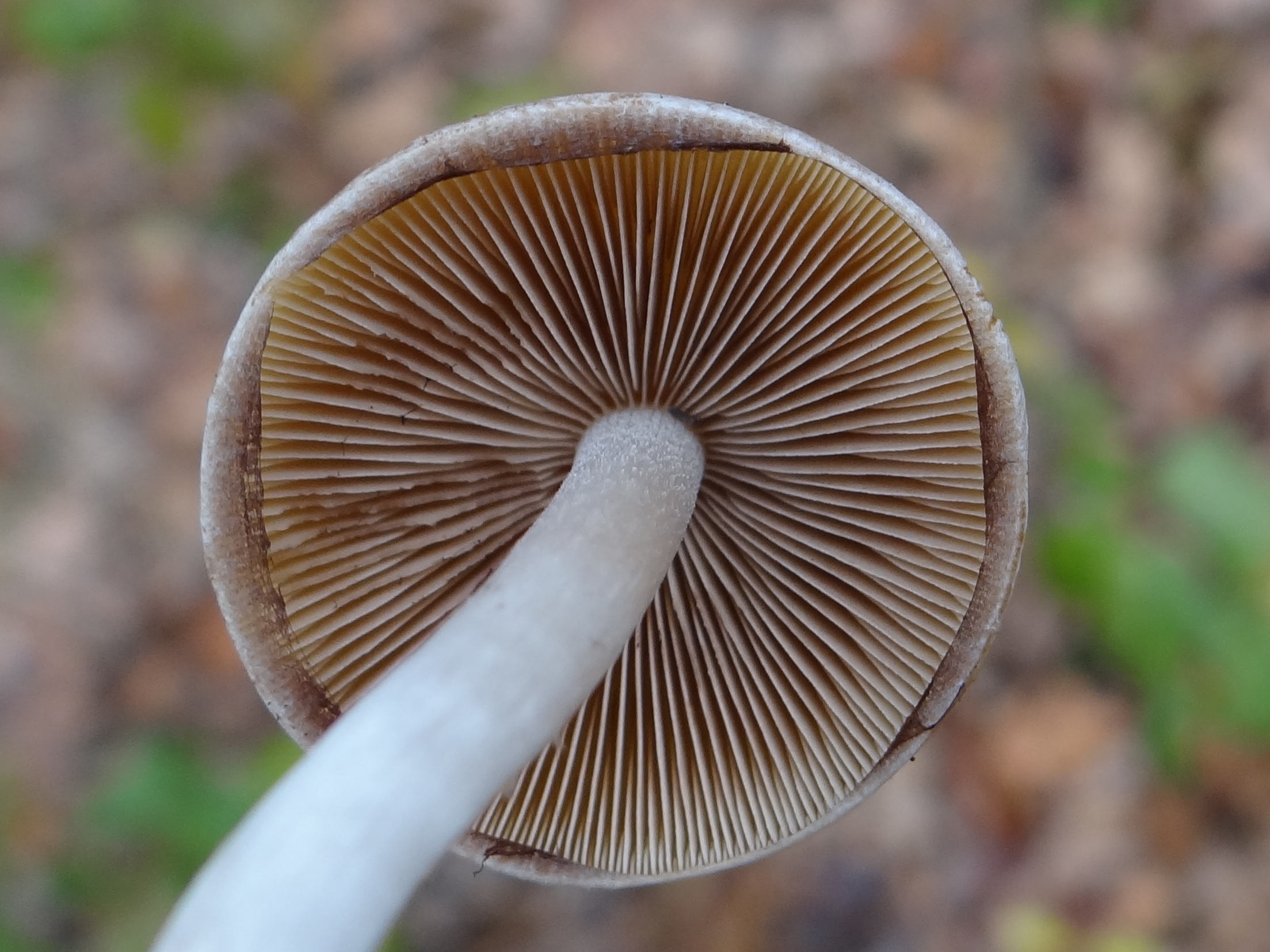

Scientific classification
- Domain: Eukaryota
- Kingdom: Fungi
- Division: Basidiomycota
- Class: Agaricomycetes
- Order: Agaricales
- Family: Amanitaceae
- Genus: Limacella
- Species: L. delicata

Binomial name
- Limacella delicata (Fr.) Earle ex Konr. & Maubl. (1930)

= Limacella delicata =

Species of fungus

Limacella delicata is a mushroom species in the genus Limacella. It is also sometimes known under the synonym Limacella glioderma (Fr.) Maire.

The reddish cap is up to 8 centimetres (3 in) wide. The whitish gills are often adnexed then become free. The stalk is up to 12 cm long and 1.5 cm thick; it has a ring, above which it is whitish. The spore print is white.
