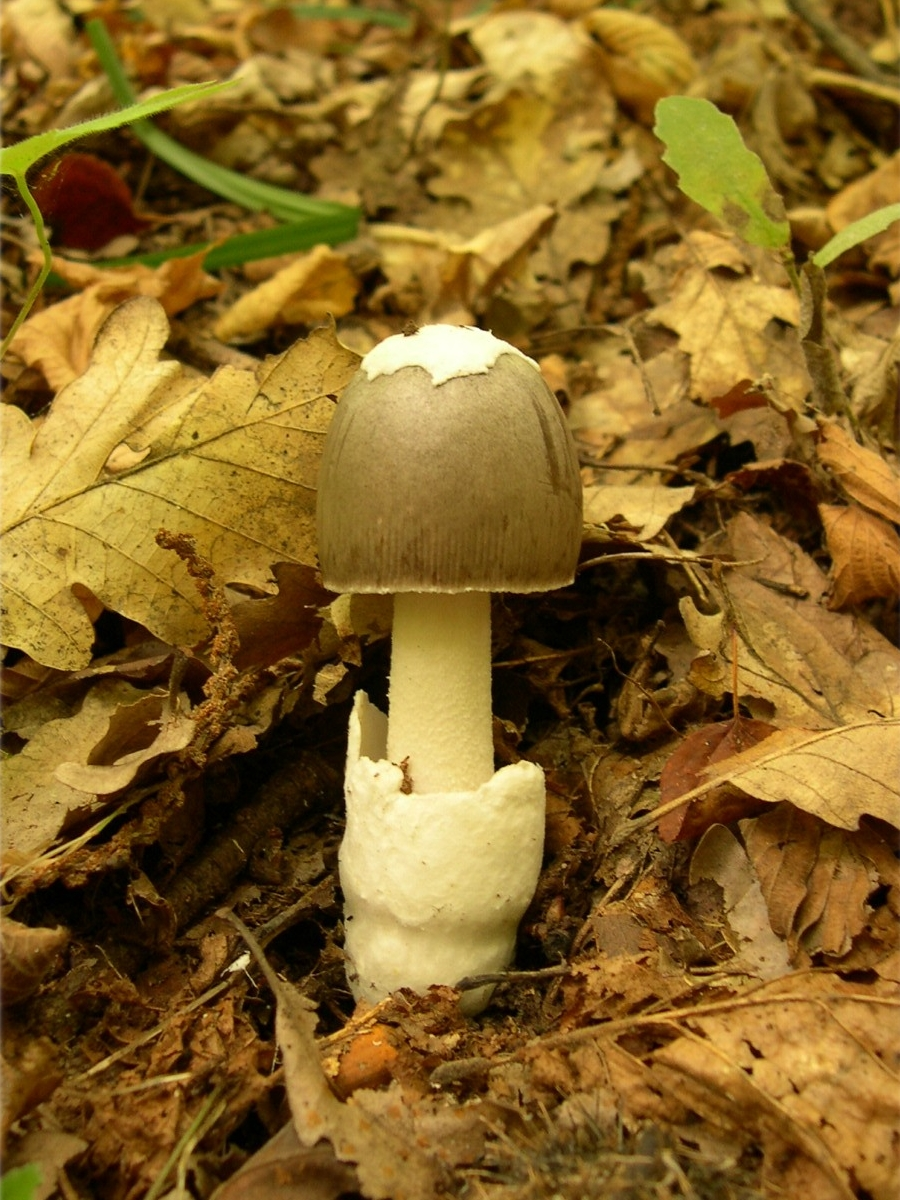

Scientific classification
- Kingdom: Fungi
- Division: Basidiomycota
- Class: Agaricomycetes
- Order: Agaricales
- Family: Amanitaceae
- Genus: Amanita
- Species: A. mairei

Binomial name
- Amanita mairei Foley, 1949

Synonyms
- Amanita crassipes (Coccia & Migl.); Amanita griseocastanea (Coccia & Migl.)

= Amanita mairei =

Species of fungus

Amanita mairei is a species of fungus belonging to the family Amanitaceae named after French botanist and mycologist René Maire.

It is native to Eurasia and Northern America.
