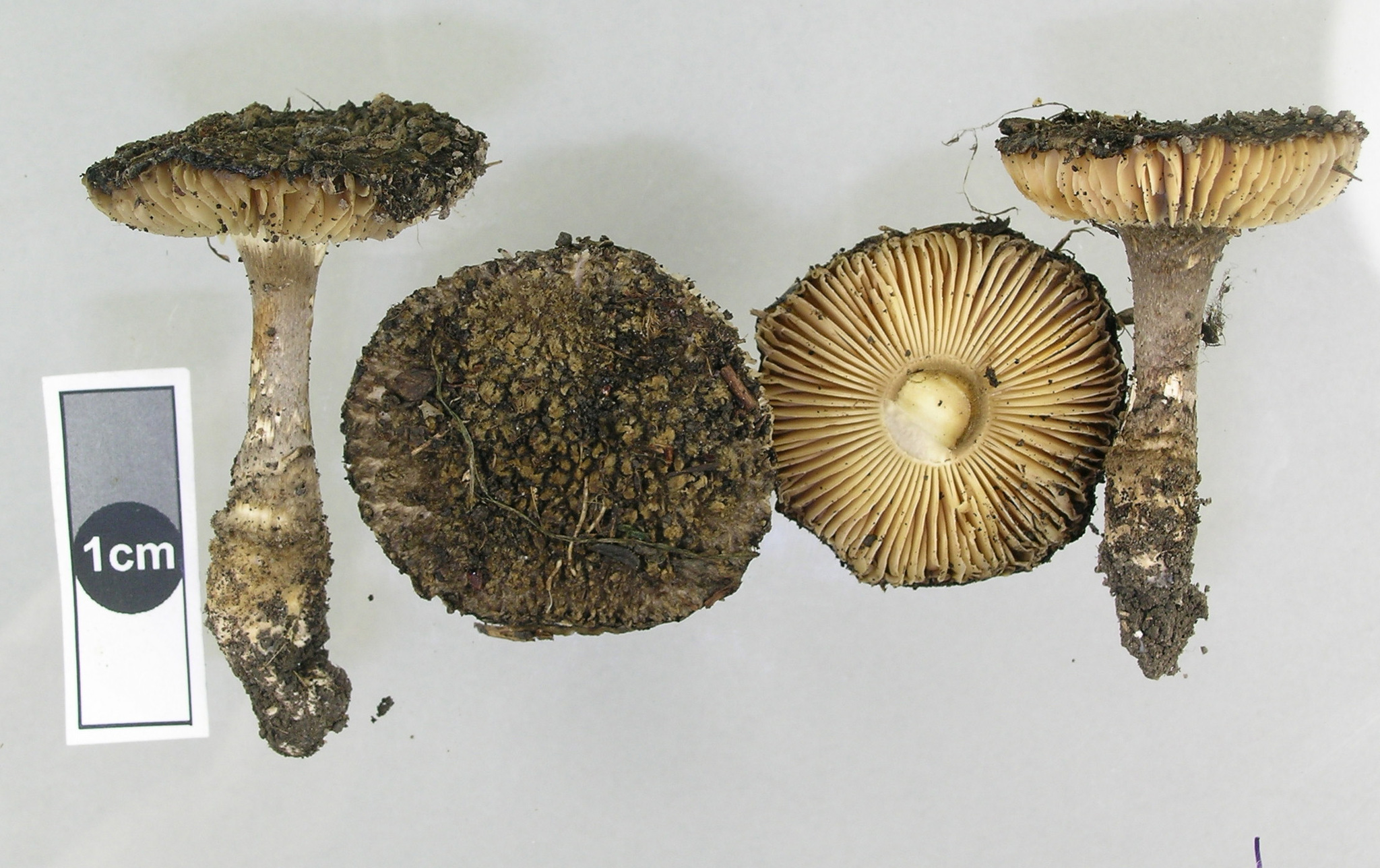

Scientific classification
- Kingdom: Fungi
- Division: Basidiomycota
- Class: Agaricomycetes
- Order: Agaricales
- Family: Amanitaceae
- Genus: Saproamanita
- Species: S. inopinata

Binomial name
- Saproamanita inopinata (D.A. Reid & Bas) Redhead, Vizzini, Drehmel & Contu (2016)

= Saproamanita inopinata =

Species of fungus

Saproamanita inopinata, commonly called unexpected amanita, is a basidomycete fungus in the subgenus Saproamanita. This species was previously called Amanita inopinata, before being briefly renamed to Aspidella inopinata until it received its current name. The native range is currently unknown, with it currently being considered introduced into both New Zealand and England.

Saproamanita inopinata
- Mycological characteristics
- Gills on hymenium
- Cap is convex or flat
- Hymenium is free
- Spore print is cream
- Ecology is saprotrophic
- Edibility is unknown

== Taxonomy ==
This species was first described in 1987 by Reid and Bass. The name "inopinata" translates into "unexpected". This was then renamed into Aspidella inopinata in 2012 based on morphological, ecological and molecular data by Vizzini and Contu. Finally this was moved to Saproamanita in 2016 by Redhead, Vizzini, Dehmel and Contu. The Amanita genus was split into the saprophytic Saproamanita and ectomycorrhizal Amanita in 2016.

== Description ==
The pileus are 2–8 centimetres (1–3 inches) in diameter, convex or applanate, finally shallowly concave with a downward curved margin, entirely covered by a thick cottony pale grey-brown felt which disrupts into very prominent darker pyramidal warts to 0–5 cm (0–2 in) high. The stipe is 4–7 cm (1 1/2–3 in) tall, 0.5–2 cm (1/4–3/4 in) wide, cylindric to slightly enlarged below before tapering to a rooting base, apex seemingly sheathed by a closely adpressed, pale grey annulus which becomes darker downward to the narrow, black, free margin. With age the portion above this black band disrupts into pale grey zig-zag bands of scales on a pale pinkish salmon-coloured background. Below the black annulus the stem of young fruitbodies is at first densely spotted with very dark grey to almost black floccose scales, which soon disappear leaving the lower part of the stem densely flecked with delicate, dark blackish brown, hair-like fibrils with recurved tips on a dirty salmon to bright tawny background, finally passing into blackish grey-brown on the rooting base. Volva not visible.

The lamellae are 1 cm (1/2 in) broad, rounded at the margin, salmon coloured. Flesh white in pileus with a slight to prominent pale grey region beneath cuticle; white in upper part of stipe passing into cream or pale salmon below.

The spores very variable in shape and size, typically broadly elliptic to ovate, thin walled, hyaline, strongly amyloid, 8–9 x 6–1 pm (in fruitbodies with 4-spored basidia) on some specimens varying from subglobose to ovate, broadly elliptic, elliptic or pip-shaped, and when there is a mixture of 2- and 4-spored basidia on the same gill the range is 8–12 x 6–8^m. Basidia clavate or lanceolate, 43–56 x 6–8/mi, thin-walled, hyaline, either 2- or 4-spored, often on the same gill, and with a basal clamp-connection. Cheilocystidia not recovered.

Structure of warts on pileus comprising chains of basically erect, thin-walled, hyaline, cylindric or barrel-shaped elements with pale brown sap and clamp-connections at the septa, reaching to 255/mi in length, and to 43/mi in width, in the lower portion of the warts the elements are often more fusiform, in the apical portion they are shorter and less regularly arranged. In some fruit-bodies the structure of the warts is modified by presence of numerous branched, highly refractive oleiferous elements. Structure of annulus similar to warts on pileus, consisting of chains of barrel-shaped, thin-walled, hyaline, clamp-bearing segments to 120/mi long and to 23pm wide.

== Distribution and habitat ==
S. inopinata was first found in Europe in 1916, and 1986 in Britain. However this is thought to be introduced because of the human intervention in the sites as well as many avid mushroom hunters whom would have found the mushroom if it had been present previously. It is also reported as an introduced species to New Zealand. S. inopinata's native range is unclear. The mushroom is also found in the Netherlands, Germany and France, however sightings since 2012 have decreased.

S. inopinata was previously thought to be mycorrhizal, forming associations with New Zealand plants (both native and introduced), including kōwhai, broadleaves, pine, Lawson Cypress and yew. It is now known to be saprotrophic.
