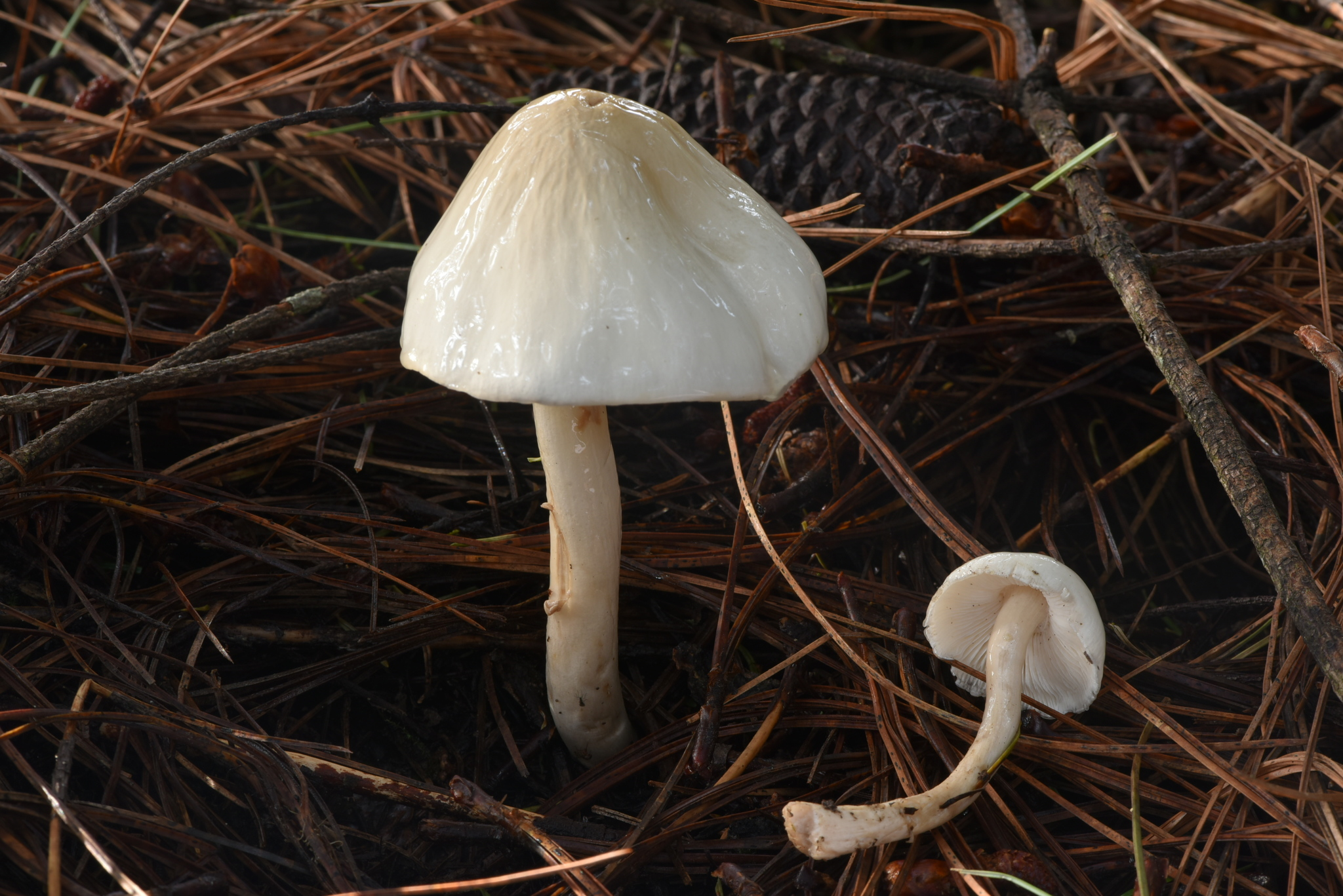

Scientific classification
- Kingdom: Fungi
- Division: Basidiomycota
- Class: Agaricomycetes
- Order: Agaricales
- Family: Amanitaceae
- Genus: Zhuliangomyces
- Species: Z. illinitus

Binomial name
- Zhuliangomyces illinitus (Fries) Redhead

Synonyms
- Agaricus illinitus; Limacella illinita; Mastocephalus illinitus

= Zhuliangomyces illinitus =

Species of fungus

Zhuliangomyces illinitus
- Mycological characteristics
- Gills on hymenium
- Cap is convex or flat
- Hymenium is free
- Stipe is bare
- Spore print is cream to white
- Ecology is saprotrophic
- Edibility is unknown

Zhuliangomyces illinitus is a mushroom-forming fungus species of genus Zhuliangomyces in the family Amanitaceae in the order Agaricales. It has recently been known as Limacella illinita, and previously as Agaricus illinitus and Mastocephalus illinitus. The fungus is known for its distinctive slimy cap, for which it is commonly known as the dripping slimecap or the overflowing slimy stem. As L. illinita, it was commonly known as the white limacella.

== Taxonomy ==
Zhuliangomyces illinitus was originally described by Elias M. Fries in 1812 as a member of Lepiota, and later changed (again by Fries) in 1874 to the subgroup Viscosae. Amanitella Maire reclassified Agaricus illinitus as Limacella illinita in 1914. Z. illinitus is part of the Amanitaceae family, with its closest relatives being the Limacella and Amanita genera, the species originally belonging to the Limacella genus until 2018. Though Zhuliangomyces's placement was originally based on the similar morphologies between itself and the Amanita genus, a phylogenetic analysis performed in 2000 confirmed this through both maximum parsimony and maximum likelihood analyses.

A 2018 study proposed splitting the Limacella genus into three separate genera, due to morphological differences in members’ stipes and pileus structures, with L. illinita being reclassified as Myxoderma illinitum. Due to the pre-existence of a Cyanobacteria clade by the same name, the new genera was then renamed Zhuliangomyces by Scott A. Redhead, giving Myxoderma illinitum the new classification Zhuliangomyces illinitus.

== Description ==
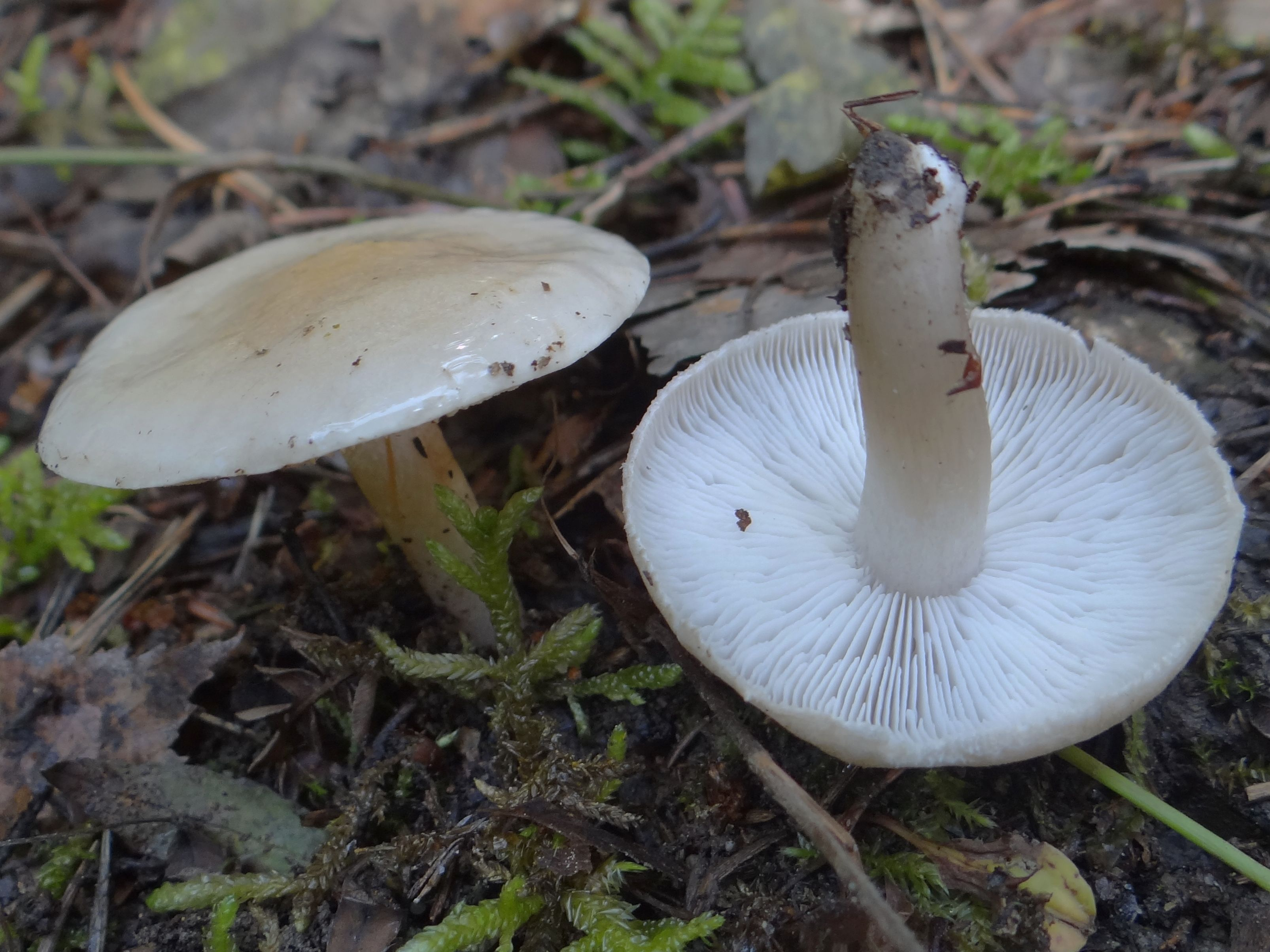
View of stipe, gills, and cap

The cap (pileus) is whitish or gray-brown and between 2–7 centimetres (3/4–2 3/4 in) in width. The caps are roundish at first and typically become convex then plane with age. They can have a broad umbo, with a smooth or slimy surface, and slimy veil remnants hanging from the margin. The gills are white. They are free from the stalk, non-waxy, close, broad, and white in color. The spores are between 4–6.5 μm, smooth, and generally spherical. The spore print is white.

The stalk is typically 5–10 cm long and can stain brown when bruised. It tapers a bit toward the top. It is fleshy, soft and has a ring. White in color, it is also sticky and slimy, as is the flesh of the fruit body. Its edibility is unknown, with the slime being a deterrent against culinary interest.

The translucent slime on the fresh cap is part of the universal veil of the fungus that does not leave the volva when mature. This slimy veil is a key difference between the Zhuliangomyces genus and its relative Amanita. Another difference between the two is that the uppermost layer of hyphae of Z. illinitus' pileus is composed of narrow, subcylindrical terminal cells. For the newly defined Zhuliangomyces, the key difference between members of this genus and the Limacella genus is the lack of a rudimentary annulus and the presence of slimy, smooth stalk.

== Ecology ==
According to Hutchinson (1998), the fungus was expected to be facultatively mycorrhizal, in which the fungus draws its nutrients from a symbiotic relationship with plant roots. However, in a laboratory setting, it was found that this species does not form ectomycorrhizal relationships with plant roots. It has since been assumed that the members of this species are saprobic, although more research is required to fully determine this. This mushroom can be found in North America, parts of Europe, and China. It is typically found scattered in temperate mixed forests, swamps, and grass lawns, growing in scattered formations.

== Biology ==
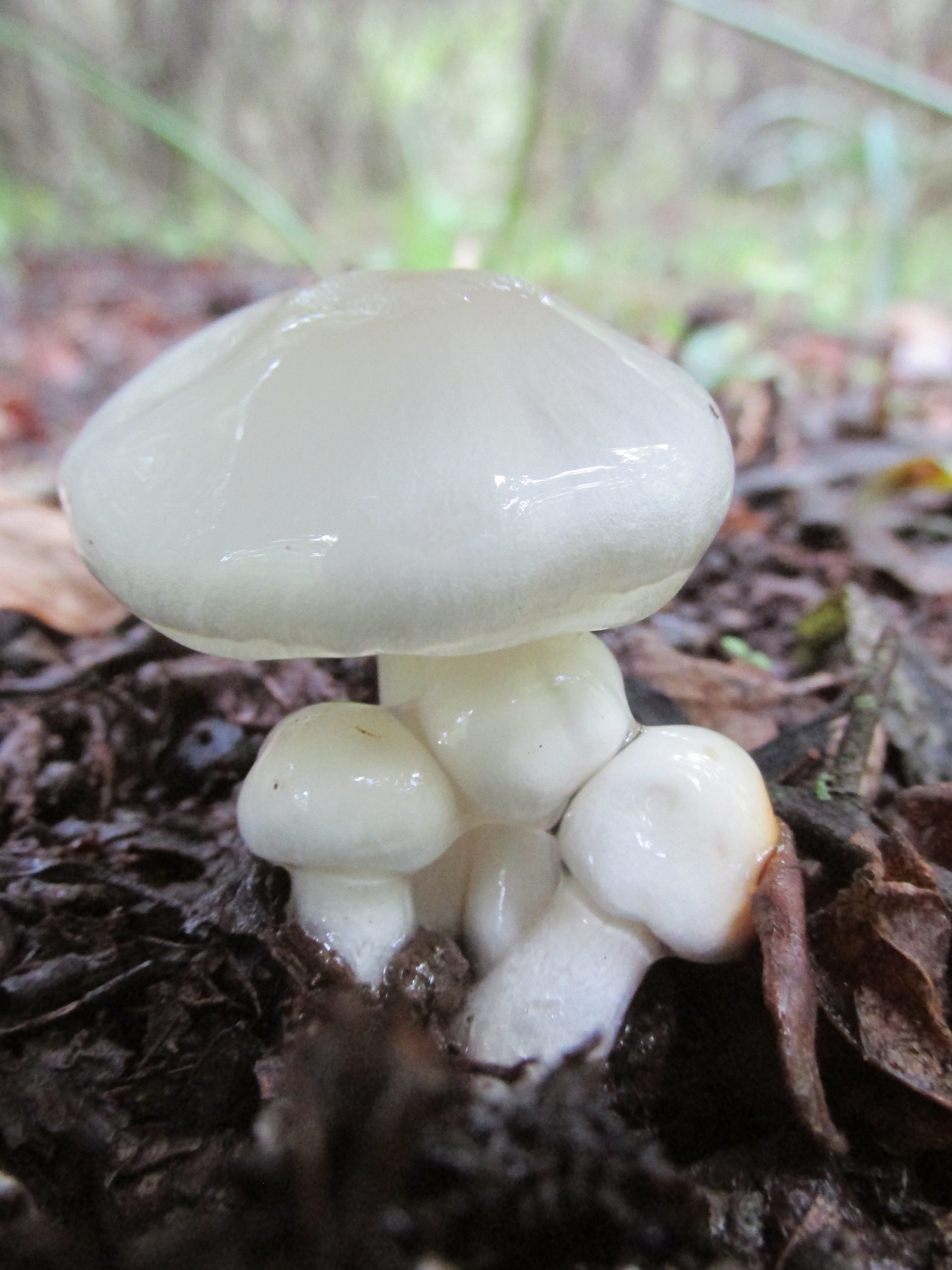

Zhuliangomyces illinitus is not currently considered economically important for humans, and its full ecological impact is unknown. In 2007, a study identified 4 unique bioactive compounds produced by Z. illinitus in vitro. Two illinitones (compounds 1 and 2) and one limcellone (compound 3), along with compound 4a, 11-Desoxyeleganthol, were isolated from the fermentative product of Z. illinitus. Compounds 2 and 3 exhibited some cytotoxic effects, while Compound 1 exhibited nematocidal activity when introduced to Caenorhabditis elegans. Compounds 1 and 3 both also inhibited the growth of plant shoots at high concentrations, with Compound 1 also affecting root growth. The biological activity of Compound 4a remains undescribed. None of the isolated molecules displayed any antibacterial properties.

== Distribution and habitat ==
L. illinita is widely distributed in North America and often found in Europe. These can habitat singly, scattered, or in groups in woods, fields, lawns, roadsides and sand dunes.

In North America, the mushrooms are in season between August or July and October or November.

== Bioactive compounds ==
The skeletal formula of muurolane

A study in 2007 discovered four new bioactive compounds from basidiomycetes, isolated from fermentations of L. illinita: Illinitone A that exhibited weak phytotoxic and moderate nematicidal activities against Caenorhabditis elegans, Illinitone B that was moderately cytotoxic, Limacellone that exhibited weak cytotoxic and phytotoxic activities and muurolane sesquiterpene 4a that was found to be inactive in the assays performed there.
