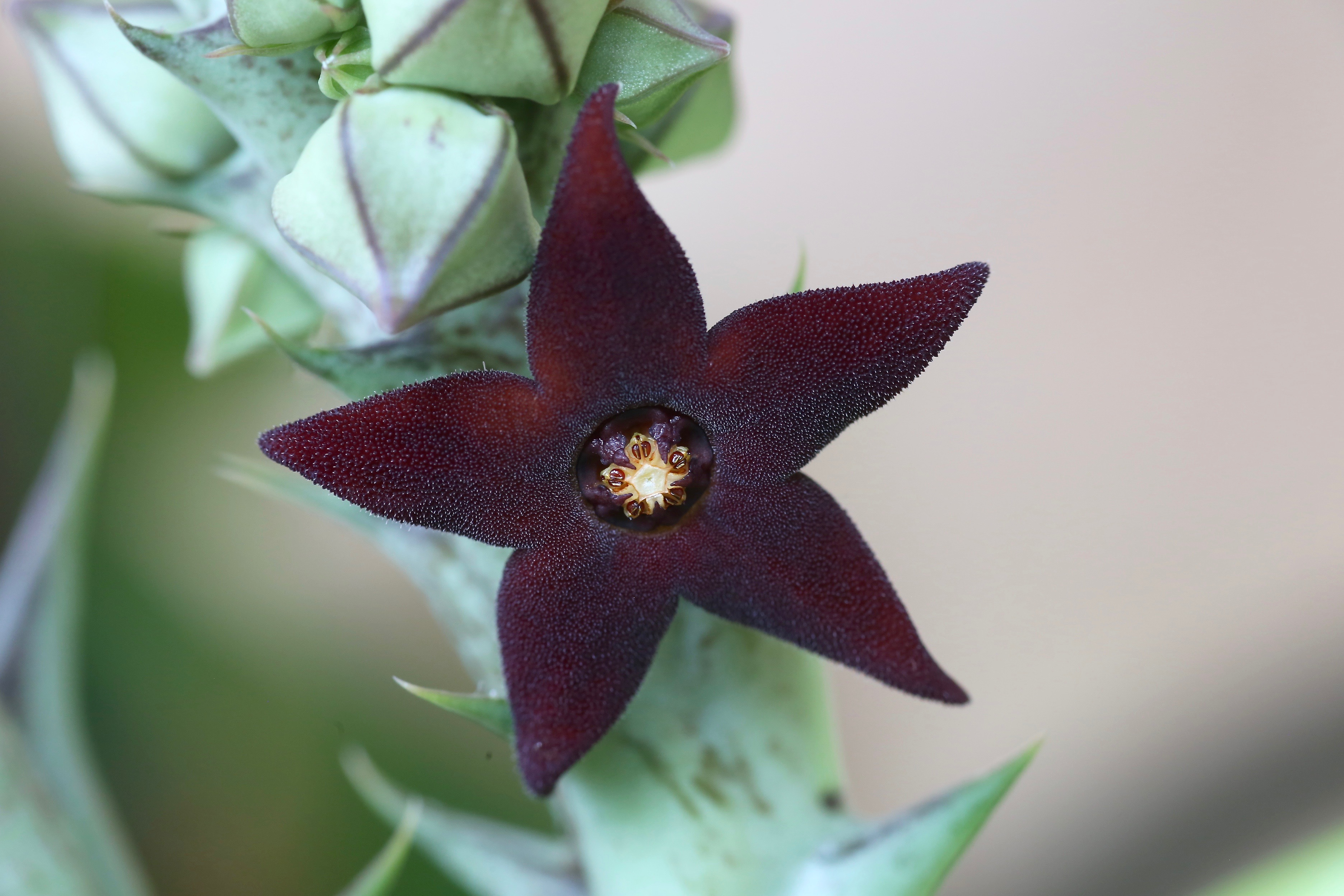
- Flower

Scientific classification
- Kingdom: Plantae
- Clade: Embryophytes
- Clade: Tracheophytes
- Clade: Spermatophytes
- Clade: Angiosperms
- Clade: Eudicots
- Clade: Asterids
- Order: Gentianales
- Family: Apocynaceae
- Genus: Orbea
- Species: O. decaisneana

Binomial name
- Orbea decaisneana (Lem.) Bruyns

Synonyms
- List: Boucerosia decaisneana Lem.; Desmidorchis decaisneana (Lem.) Kuntze; Caralluma decaisneana (Lem.) N.E.Br.; Stapelia decaisneana (Lem.) A.Chev.; Pachycymbium decaisneanum (Lem.) M.G.Gilbert; Angolluma decaisneana (Lem.) L.E.Newton; Caralluma hesperidum Maire; Caralluma commutata subsp. hesperidum (Maire) Maire; Caralluma decaisneana subsp. hesperidum (Maire) Raynaud; Orbea decaisneana subsp. hesperidum (Maire) Jonkers; Angolluma hesperidum (Maire) Plowes; Caralluma venenosa Maire; Angolluma venenosa (Maire) Plowes; Angolluma sudanensis Plowes

= Orbea decaisneana =

Species of plant in the genus Orbea

Orbea decaisneana is a succulent subshrub and grows primarily in the desert or dry shrubland biome. It is native to north Africa; Algeria, Burkina Faso, Mali, Mauritania, Morocco, Niger, Senegal, and Sudan/South Sudan.

The plants found in Morocco have been called Caralluma decaisneana subsp. hesperidum but this subspecies is not recognised by POWO. Some botanists argue that they are sufficiently different to be their own subspecies or even species - the flowers even have very different smells.

== Description ==
Stems erect, more or less cylindrical, slender, apically tapering, whitish green, marbled or spotted with brown, 10 - 40 × 1.5 cm diameter, 3- to 6-ribbed, sides conspicuously furrowed; tubercles 0.7 - 1.5 cm, strong, conical-subulate, horizontal to ascending. Inflorescence with 1 - 3 more or less erect flowers; peduncle cushion-like, 1- to 20-flowered, sometimes with 1 mm long filiform bract; pedicel 1 - 5mm, more or less conical; sepals 4 - 5 mm. Corolla dark purple or reddish-brown, 1.5 - 2.5 cm diameter, flat, tube 4 (-6) × 8 mm diameter, campanulate, embracing the corona.

The species complex is widely spread and variable.

== Names ==
Called taïberou by the Tuareg in south Algeria.

== Toxicity ==
Said to be very poisonous by the Tuareg of southern Algeria. Never eaten by herbivorous animals. The name Caralluma venenosa (now lumped under Orbea decaisneana) was given by the botanist René Maire for this reason - venenosa meaning poisonous in Latin. Unlike other stapeliads that grow among spiny shrubs for protection in Morocco, this plant grows in the open, protected from overgrazing by being poisonous. In North Africa, used as a fish poison and in hunting small mammals and birds.

== Cultivation ==
Common in cultivation by succulent enthusiasts, as it is easy to grow.
