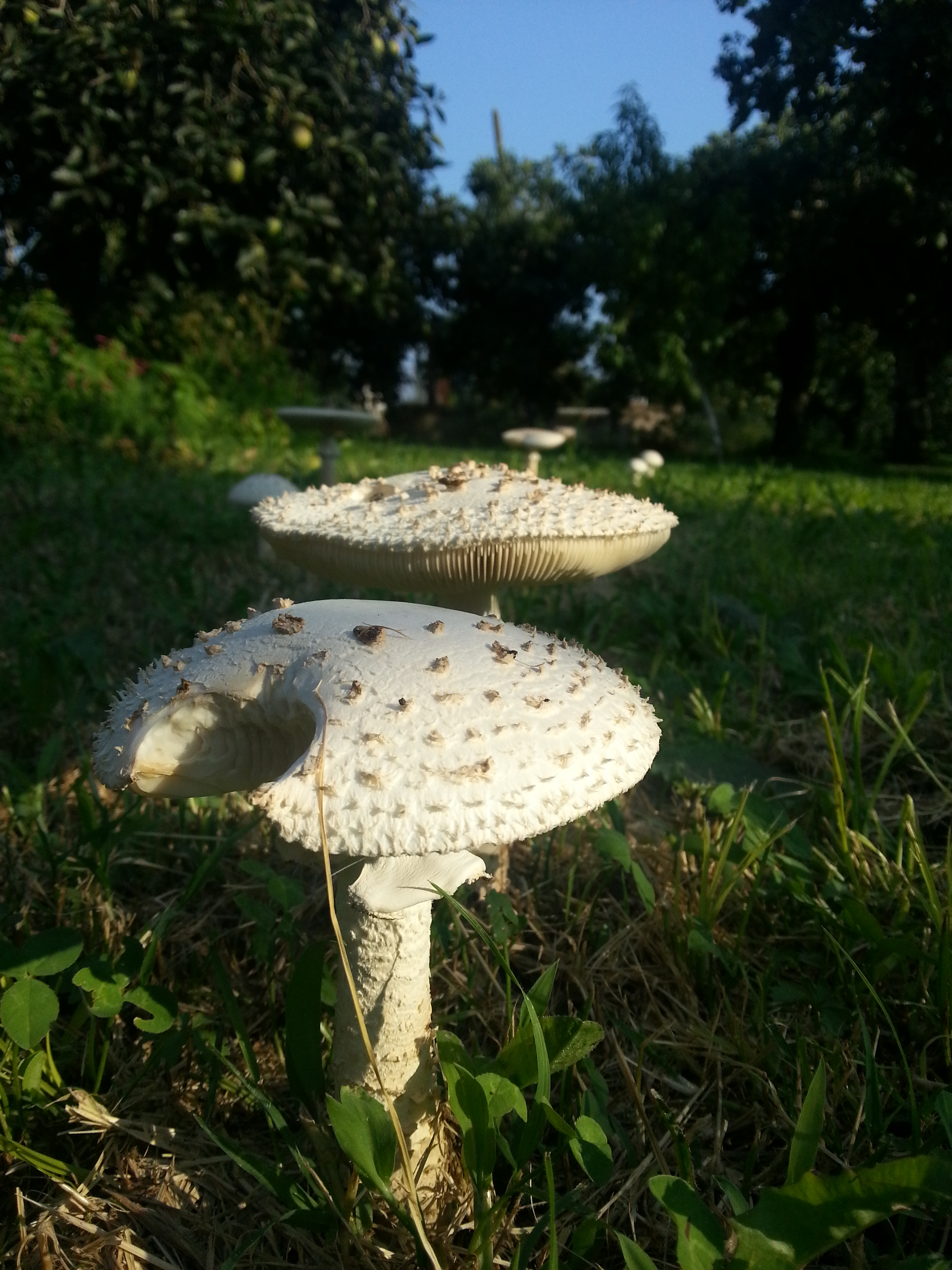
- Saproamanita vittadinii in grass in Italy

Scientific classification
- Kingdom: Fungi
- Division: Basidiomycota
- Class: Agaricomycetes
- Order: Agaricales
- Family: Amanitaceae
- Genus: Saproamanita; Redhead, Vizzini, Drehmel & Contu (2016)

Type species
- Saproamanita vittadinii (Moretti) Redhead, Vizzini, Drehmel & Contu (2016)

Diversity
- c. 23 species

Synonyms
- Lepidella E.-J. Gilbert (1925); Amanita subgen. Lepidella Beauseigneur (1925); Aspidella E.-J. Gilbert (1940); Amanita subgen. Aspidella E.-J. Gilbert (1941); Amanita sect. Lepidella Corner & Bas (1962); Amanita sect. Aspidella Pomerleau (1966); Amanita subsect. Vittadinae Bas (1969); Amanita ser. Vittadinae (Bas) Neville & Poumarat (2004)

= Saproamanita =

Genus of fungi

Saproamanita is a genus of agarics with 24 species. It is one of six genera in the family Amanitaceae, of which the similar Amanita is also a member. Saproamanita differs from Amanita in that its species are saprophytic, and not ectomycorrhizal.

== Description ==
Saproamanita resemble Amanita. They have a pileus, free lamellae, a central stipe, and an annulus. Below the annulus are scales and rings, remnants of the universal veil composed largely of cylindrical to slender, clavate, inflated hyphal cells mostly scattered in the central stipe region (rather than the base). The spores are white and amyloid.

== Taxonomy ==
The name refers to the saprotrophic life style and the generic relationship to its sister genus, Amanita. In earlier studies the genus was ill-defined and named Lepidella and later Aspidella. Both of these names are unusable because of earlier usage by biologists for other organisms, e.g. Aspidella E. Billings. The most recent adoption of the name Aspidella was based on a molecularly and ecologically defined genus similar to the current circumscription.

DNA molecular evidence for the separation of the genus from Amanita was first detected in a 2002 study, which showed that S. armillariiformis (then classified as an Amanita) appeared basal to Amanita. Later studies, supported by larger samplings of species and additional gene regions in investigations of Amanitaceae, expanded the sampling of both groups of species that were all considered to be Amanita species or separated into two genera under the names Aspidella and Amanita. In that most detailed study of decomposition pathway enzymes that lends support for taxonomic separation, the subgeneric name Amanita subgen. Lepidella was misapplied to a group of species that did not include the type species of the subgenus; that subgeneric group of mycorrhizal species is more correctly named Amanita subgen. Amanitina.

Currently there are two competing contemporary classifications, one that recognizes the two genera, Amanita and Saproamanita, and the other that maintains both genera under the older name Amanita.

A recent phylogenetic tree for the genus included information from Thailand by Nakarin Suwannarach and Surapong Khuna.

== Distribution and habitat ==
Saproamanita are known to inhabit grasslands, lawns, pastures, fens, and fields in Africa, Asia including the Indian subcontinent and Thailand, Australia, Europe, including Mediterranean islands (e.g. Cyprus) and England, North America, including Mexico, the Caribbean, and South America, as well as glens in open canopy forests. Some species are known to form fairy rings. At least three of the species are invasive species expanding their ranges, S. inopinata in Europe, S. thiersii in North America, and S. manicata in Hawaii.

== Genome sequencing ==
The genome of S. thiersii (as Amanita thiersii) and its cellulose degrading capability are the subject of a US Department of Energy, Joint Genome Institute project.

== Species ==
- Saproamanita ameghinoi
- Saproamanita armillariiformis
- Saproamanita codinae
- Saproamanita flavofloccosa
- Saproamanita foetidissima
- Saproamanita grallipes
- Saproamanita inopinata
- Saproamanita lilloi
- Saproamanita manicata
- Saproamanita nana
- Saproamanita nauseosa
- Saproamanita pleropus
- Saproamanita praeclara
- Saproamanita praegraveolens
- Saproamanita prairiicola
- Saproamanita pruittii
- Saproamanita quitensis
- Saproamanita roseolescens
- Saproamanita savannae
- Saproamanita silvifuga
- Saproamanita singeri
- Saproamanita subcaligata
- Saproamanita thiersii
- Saproamanita vittadinii
