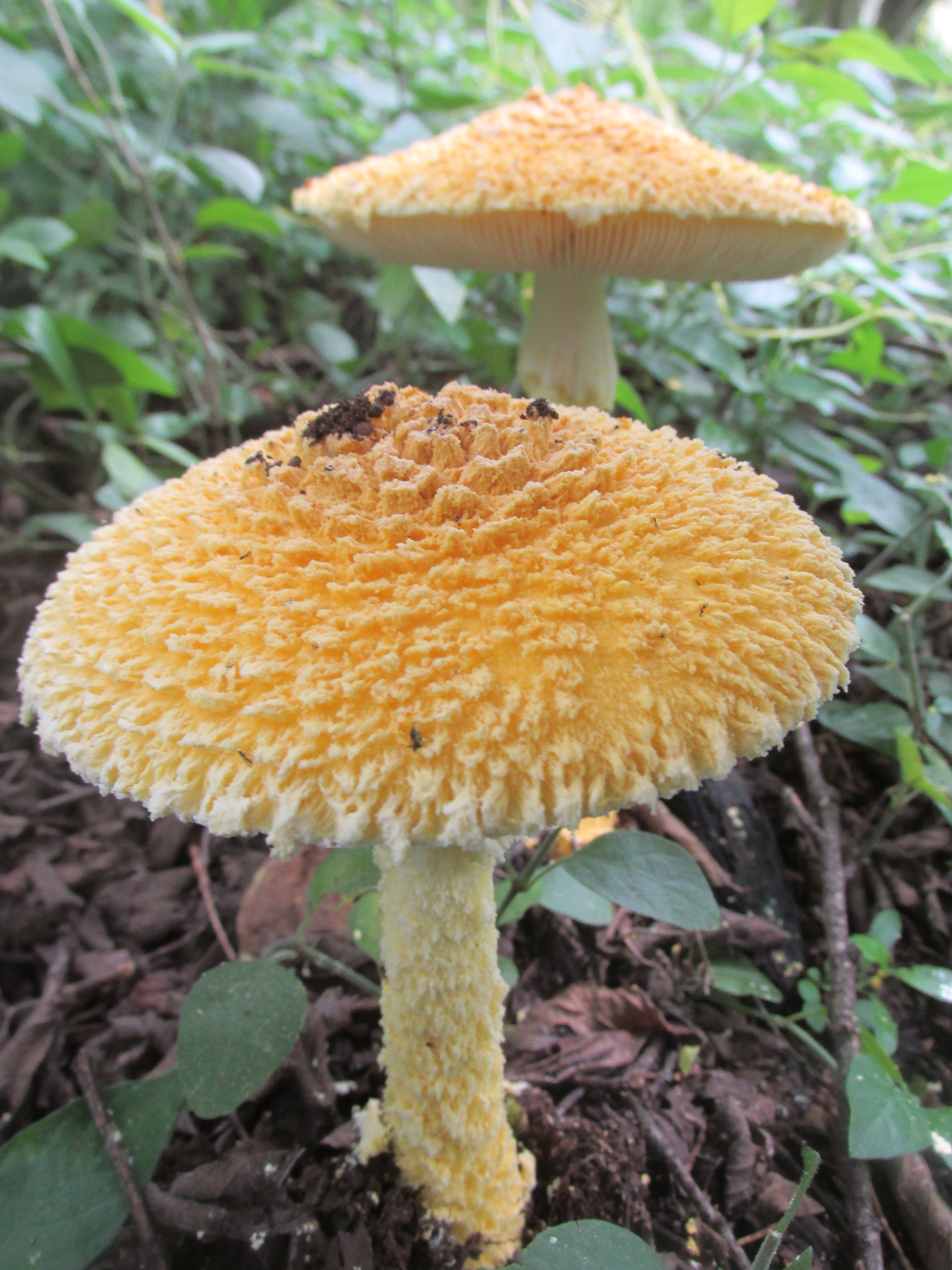
- Image by Liz Popich

Scientific classification
- Kingdom: Fungi
- Division: Basidiomycota
- Class: Agaricomycetes
- Order: Agaricales
- Family: Amanitaceae
- Genus: Amanita
- Species: A. aureofloccosa

Binomial name
- Amanita aureofloccosa (Bas) Vizzini & Contu

Synonyms
- Aspidella aurea; Aspidella aureofloccosa; Lepiota aurea; Lepiota zenkeri

= Amanita aureofloccosa =

Species of fungus

Amanita aureofloccosa
- Mycological characteristics
- Gills on hymenium
- Cap is convex
- Hymenium is free
- Stipe has a ring
- Spore print is white
- Ecology is saprotrophic
- Edibility is unknown

Amanita aureofloccosa, or the golden floccose lepidella, is a species of fungus, first reported in the Democratic Republic of the Congo as a species of Lepiota. It is also found in Brazil, South Africa, New Zeeland, Thailand, and Ghana. It grows in semi-deciduous forests, from April to September. It can be found singly or in scattered groups.

== Description ==
Amanita aureofloccosa is easily identified by its shaggy cap and yellow-gold color. Its cap has small scales and can measure up to 8 cm in diameter. Both the cap and stipe are covered with fluff-like tufts, which are volval remnants. The stipe can measure up to 14 cm long and is roughly 2 cm in diameter. Gills are white. A. aureofloccosa has no distinctive smell and its spore print is white.
