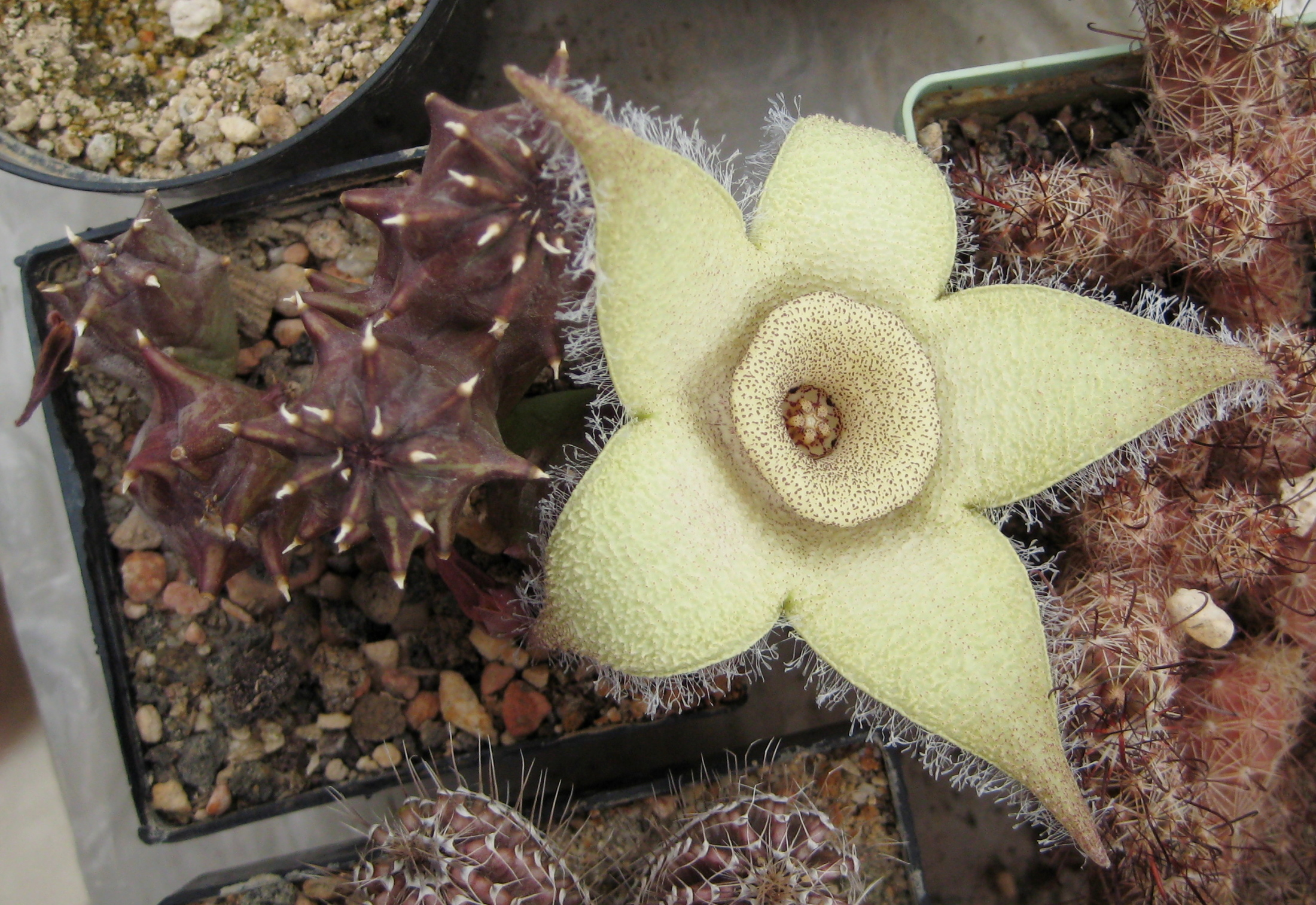
- In bloom
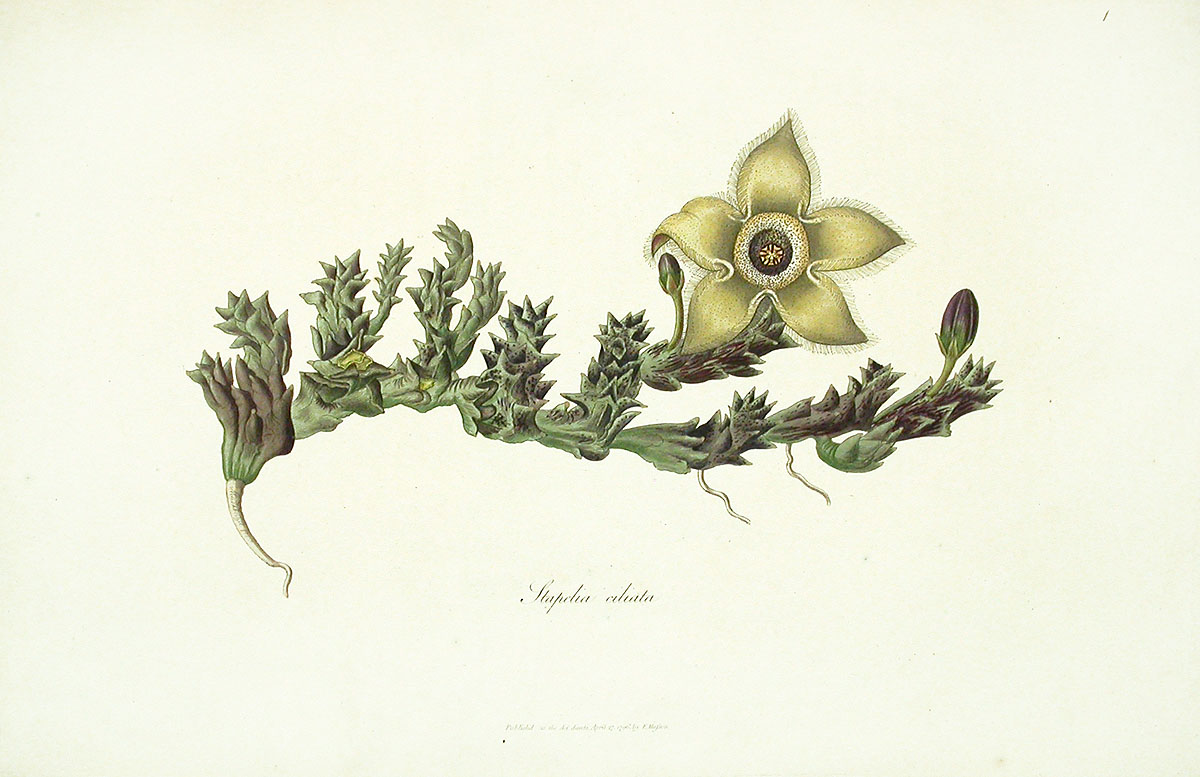
- Botanical illustration

Scientific classification
- Kingdom: Plantae
- Clade: Tracheophytes
- Clade: Angiosperms
- Clade: Eudicots
- Clade: Asterids
- Order: Gentianales
- Family: Apocynaceae
- Genus: Orbea
- Species: O. ciliata

Binomial name
- Orbea ciliata (Thunb.) L.C.Leach

Synonyms
- List: Ceropegia ciliatioris Bruyns; Diplocyatha ciliata (Thunb.) N.E.Br.; Podanthes ciliata (Thunb.) Haw.; Stapelia ciliata Thunb.; Stapelia ciliata var. cristata P.V.Heath; Tromotriche ciliata (Thunb.) Sweet

= Orbea ciliata =

Species of plant in the genus Orbea

Orbea ciliata, called the starfish stapelia, is a species of flowering plant in the family Apocynaceae, native to the Cape Provinces of South Africa. A succulent, it has gained the Royal Horticultural Society's Award of Garden Merit.
