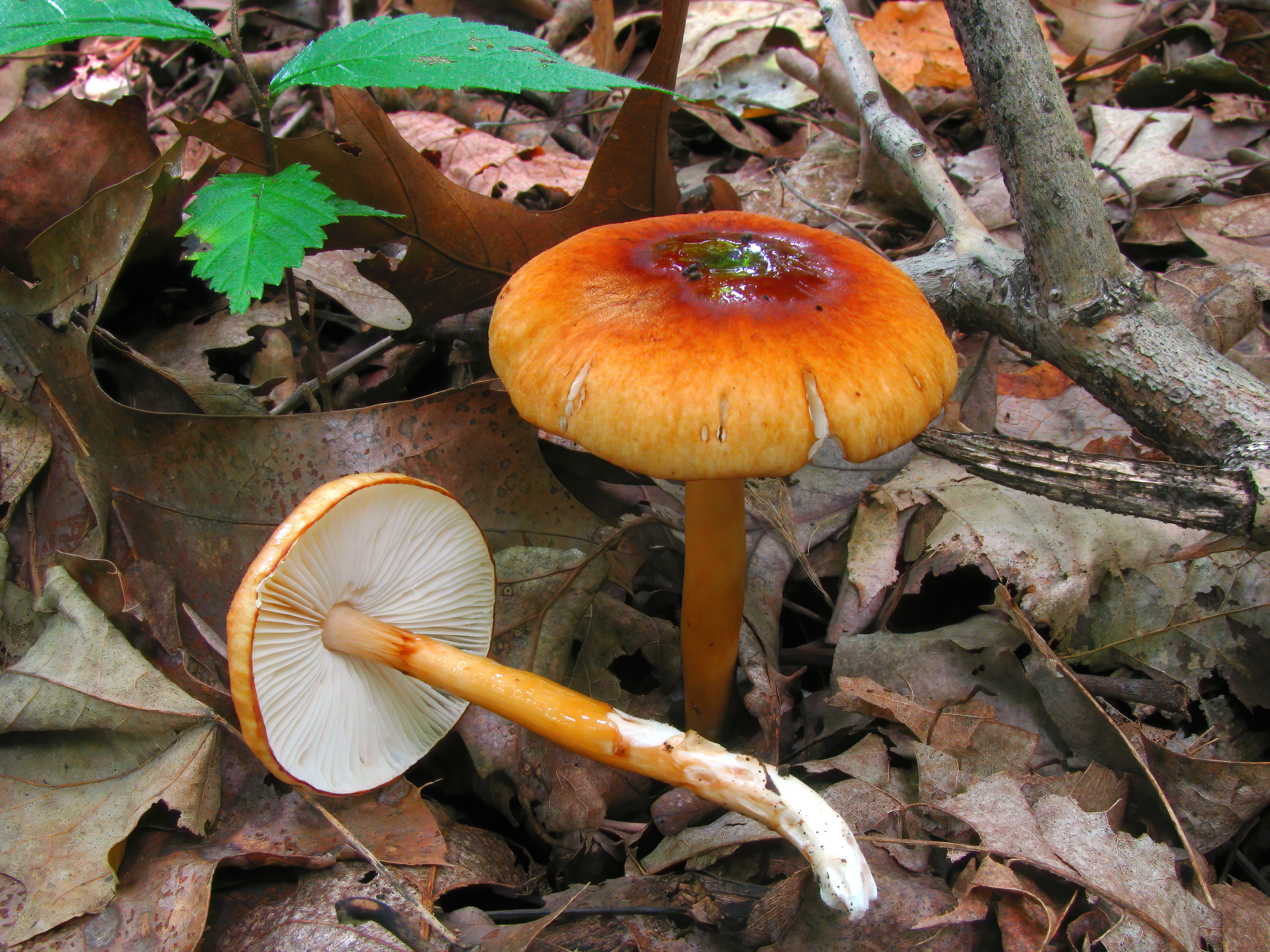
- Limacella glischra

Scientific classification
- Kingdom: Fungi
- Division: Basidiomycota
- Class: Agaricomycetes
- Order: Agaricales
- Family: Amanitaceae
- Genus: Limacella; Earle (1909)

Type species
- Limacella delicata (Fr.) Earle ex Konrad & Maubl. (1930)

= Limacella =

Genus of fungi

Limacella is a genus of mushroom-forming fungi in the family Amanitaceae in order Agaricales. Some of the species have been classified as members of genus Lepiota. Limacella was described by mycologist Franklin Sumner Earle in 1909.

In some older classification schemes, Limacella has alternatively been placed in family Pluteaceae. The species formerly classified in the genus Limacella are now placed in 4 genera; Catatrama, Limacellopsis, Limacella, and Zhuliangomyces.

== Species ==
| Name | Taxon author | Year |
|---|---|---|
| Limacella alachuana | (Murrill) Pegler | 1983 |
| Limacella anomologa | (Berk. & Broome) Pegler | 1986 |
| Limacella arida | (Gillet) Konrad & Maubl. | 1926 |
| Limacella asperulospora | Corner | 1994 |
| Limacella bangladeshana | M.I. Hosen & T.H. Li | 2017 |
| Limacella bentista | (Morgan) Murrill | 1914 |
| Limacella broadwayi | (Murrill) H.V. Sm. | 1966 |
| Limacella brunneovenosa | C.C. Nascimento & Wartchow | 2018 |
| Limacella delicata | (Fr.) Earle ex Konrad & Maubl. | 1930 |
| Limacella floridana | (Murrill) H.V. Sm. | 1945 |
| Limacella fulvodisca | (Peck) Murrill | 1912 |
| Limacella furnacea | (Letell.) E.-J. Gilbert | 1928 |
| Limacella glischra | (Morgan) Murrill | 1914 |
| Limacella grisea | Singer | 1989 |
| Limacella kauffmanii | H.V. Sm. | 1945 |
| Limacella laeviceps | (Speg.) Raithelh. | 1980 |
| Limacella magna | B. Kumari & R.C. Upadhyay | 2013 |
| Limacella megalopoda | (Bres.) Maire | 1926 |
| Limacella myochroa | Pegler | 1983 |
| Limacella myxodictyon | (Berk. & Broome) Pegler | 1986 |
| Limacella oaxacana | Singer | 1958 |
| Limacella oblita | (Peck) Murrill | 1914 |
| Limacella ochraceorosea | (Béguet & Bon) Neville & Poumarat | 2004 |
| Limacella olivaceobrunnea | Hongo | 1978 |
| Limacella persoonii | (Fr.) Konrad & Maubl. | 1926 |
| Limacella pitereka | Grgur. | 1997 |
| Limacella quilonensis | Sathe & J.T. Daniel | 1981 |
| Limacella rhodopus | (Bres.) Pegler | 1966 |
| Limacella roseofloccosa | Hora | 1960 |
| Limacella roseola | Murrill | 1943 |
| Limacella singaporeana | Corner | 1994 |
| Limacella solidipes | (Peck) H.V. Sm. | 1945 |
| Limacella steppicola | Zerova | 1974 |
| Limacella steppicola | Zerova & Wasser | 1988 |
| Limacella subfurnacea | Contu | 1990 |
| Limacella subglischra | (S. Imai) S. Ito | 1959 |
| Limacella subpessundata | (Murrill) Singer | 1942 |
| Limacella subtropicana | A. Izhar, Niazi, M. Asif, Haqnawaz, H. Bashir & Khalid | 2022 |
| Limacella taiwanensis | Zhu L. Yang & W.N. Chou | 2002 |
| Limacella wheroparaonea | G.S. Ridl. | 1993 |
