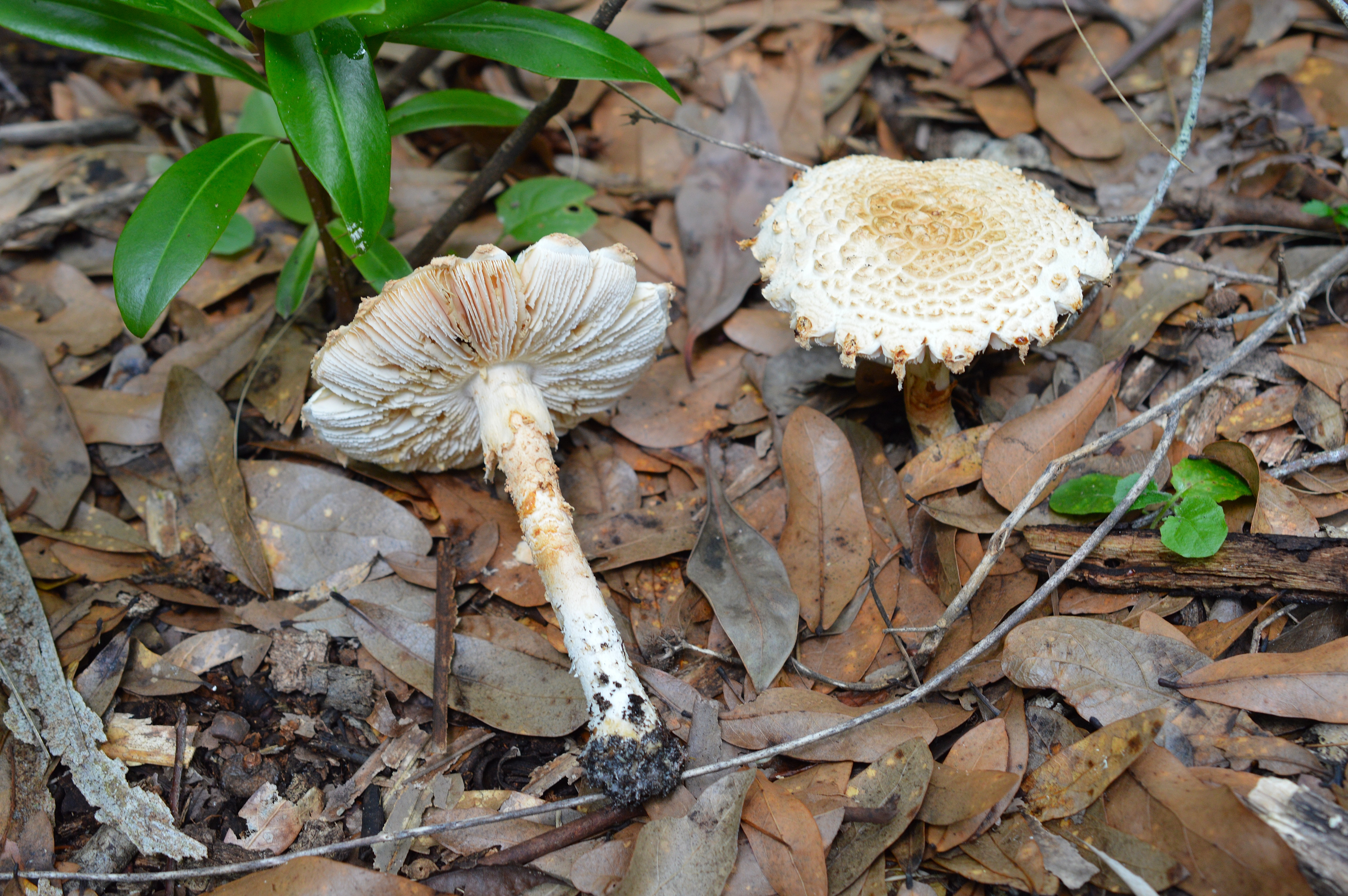

Scientific classification
- Kingdom: Fungi
- Division: Basidiomycota
- Class: Agaricomycetes
- Order: Agaricales
- Family: Amanitaceae
- Genus: Saproamanita
- Species: S. nauseosa

Binomial name
- Saproamanita nauseosa (Wakef.) Redhead, Vizzini, Drehmel & Contu (2016)

Synonyms
- Amanita nauseosa (Wakef.) D.A.Reid (1966); Lepiota nauseosa Wakef. (1918); Aspidella nauseosa (Wakef.) Vizzini & Contu (2012)

= Saproamanita nauseosa =

Species of fungus

Saproamanita nauseosa is a species of agaric fungus in the family Amanitaceae. First described by English mycologist Elsie Maud Wakefield in 1918 as a species of Lepiota, it was named for its nauseating odor. The type specimen was found growing on soil in the Nepenthes greenhouse at Kew Gardens. Derek Reid transferred the species to Amanita in 1966, and then in 2016 the separate genus Saproamanita was created by Redhead et al. for saprophytic Amanitas and it was transferred to this new genus.

The fungus is found in Australia and the Caribbean region of North America.

== See also ==
- List of Amanita species
