= Maireella =

Scientific classification
- Kingdom: Fungi
- Division: Ascomycota
- Class: Dothideomycetes
- Subclass: incertae sedis
- Genus: Maireella; Syd. & Maire

Type species
- Maireella maculans Syd.

Species
- M. andina M. bertioides M. guianensis M. maculans M. melioloides M. tarrietiae M. tasmanica

Genus of fungi

Maireella is a genus of fungi in the class Dothideomycetes. The relationship of this taxon to other taxa within the class is unknown (incertae sedis).

The genus name of Maireella is in honour of René Charles Joseph Ernest Maire (1878–1949), who was a French botanist and mycologist.

The genus was circumscribed in Ann. Mycol. vol.6 on page 145 in 1908.

== See also ==
- List of Dothideomycetes genera incertae sedis
