= Mairetis =

Scientific classification
- Kingdom: Plantae
- Clade: Tracheophytes
- Clade: Angiosperms
- Clade: Eudicots
- Clade: Asterids
- Order: Boraginales
- Family: Boraginaceae
- Genus: Mairetis; I.M.Johnst.
- Species: M. microsperma

Binomial name
- Mairetis microsperma (Boiss.) I.M.Johnst.

Synonyms
- Lithospermum microspermum Boiss.; Lithospermum webbii Coss. & Durieu; Rhytispermum apulum Webb & Berthel.

Species of plants

Mairetis is a monotypic genus of flowering plants belonging to the family Boraginaceae. It only contains one known species, Mairetis microsperma.

It is native to the Canary Islands and Morocco.

The genus name of Mairetis is in honour of René Maire (1878–1949), a French botanist and mycologist. The Latin specific epithet of microsperma means 'micro' meaning small and 'sperma' the Greek word for seed. Both the genus and species were first described and published in J. Arnold Arbor. Vol.34 on page 4 in 1953.
