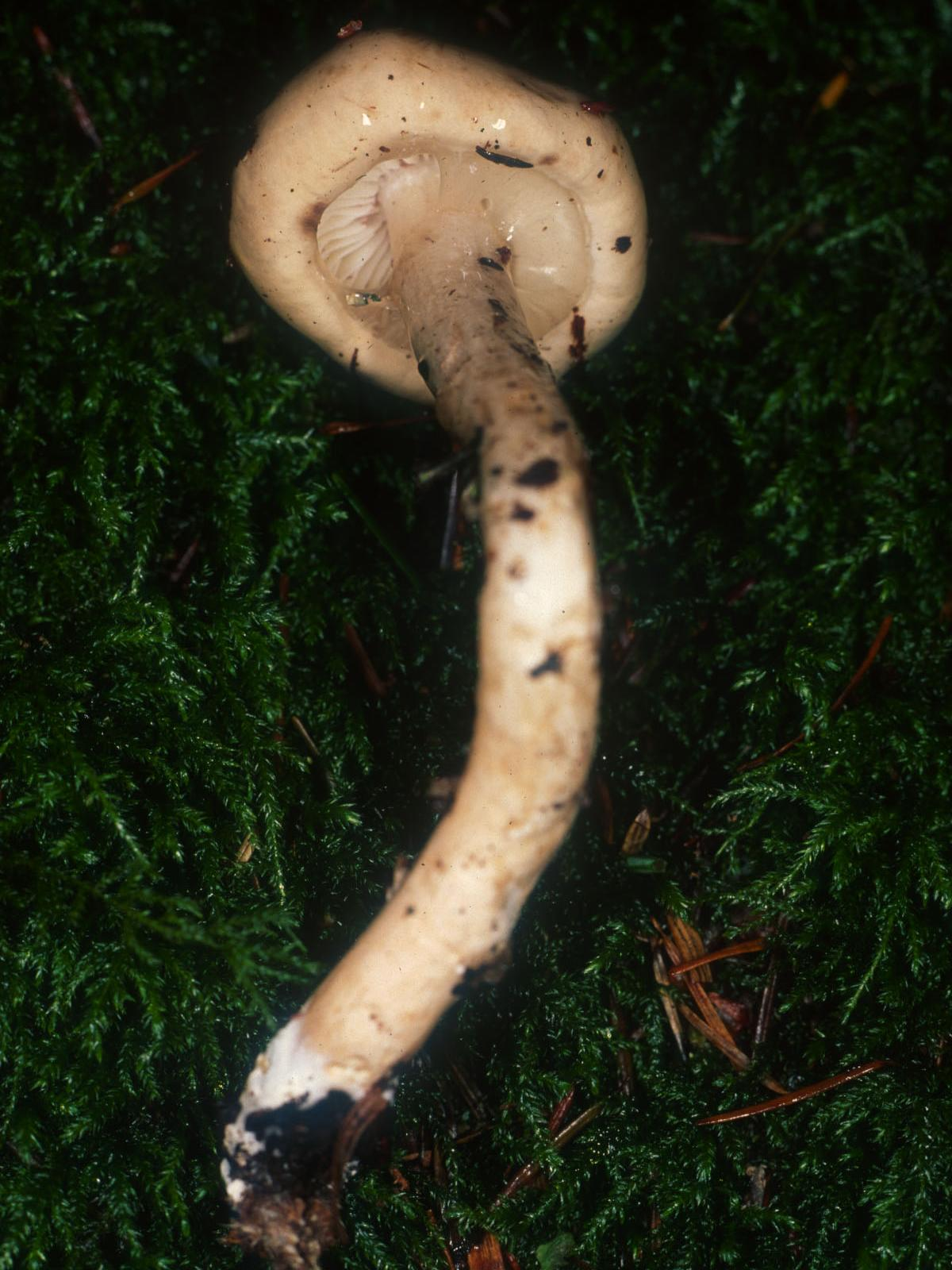
- Zhuliangomyces illinitus

Scientific classification
- Kingdom: Fungi
- Division: Basidiomycota
- Class: Agaricomycetes
- Order: Agaricales
- Family: Amanitaceae
- Genus: Zhuliangomyces; Redhead (2019)

Type species
- Zhuliangomyces olivaceus (Zhu L. Yang, Y.Y. Cui & Q. Cai) Redhead (2019)

= Zhuliangomyces =

Genus of mushroom

Zhuliangomyces is a genus of mushroom-forming fungi in the family Amanitaceae in order Agaricales. Analysis of DNA sequences was used to show that Zhuliangomyces was separate from Limacella which is similar in appearance and the genus name Myxoderma was adopted. The name Myxoderma was previously used for a genus of Cyanobacteria and thus the fungal generic name was replaced by Zhuliangomyces.

== Species ==
Name	Taxon Author	Year
Zhuliangomyces illinitus	(Fr.) Redhead	2019
Zhuliangomyces lenticularis	(Lasch) Redhead	2019
Zhuliangomyces ochraceoluteus	(P.D. Orton) Redhead	2019
Zhuliangomyces olivaceus	(Zhu L. Yang, Y.Y. Cui & Q. Cai) Redhead	2019
Zhuliangomyces pakistanicus	Usman & Khalid	2020
Zhuliangomyces subillinitus	(Guzmán) Redhead	2019
