= Amanita prairiicola =

American Prairie Lepidella

Scientific classification
- Domain: Eukaryota
- Kingdom: Fungi
- Division: Basidiomycota
- Class: Agaricomycetes
- Order: Agaricales
- Family: Amanitaceae
- Genus: Amanita
- Species: A. prairiicola

Binomial name
- Amanita prairiicola Peck

Synonyms
- Amanitopsis malheurensis Trueblood, O. K. Mill. & Dav. T. Jenkins

Species of fungus

Amanita prairiicola Mycological characteristics
- Gills on hymenium
- Cap is convex or flat
- Hymenium is free
- Spore print is white
- Edibility is unknown

Amanita prairiicola is an American fungus. Its cap is white, 6–20 centimetres (2 1/2–8 inches) across, and usually flat to convex. The gills are a cream to gold hue, free, crowded, and broad. The stalk is 15–20 by 2–4 cm (6–8 by 1–1 1/2 in), and is also cream colored.

The species is native to western North America from Oregon to Arizona and eastward to Kansas. One specimen has been described in Argentina, though it may have been imported with soil. Unlike most Amanita species, it does not appear to need a mycorrhizal host and has been found in areas with no potential for a host, such as open cultivated fields and deserts.
