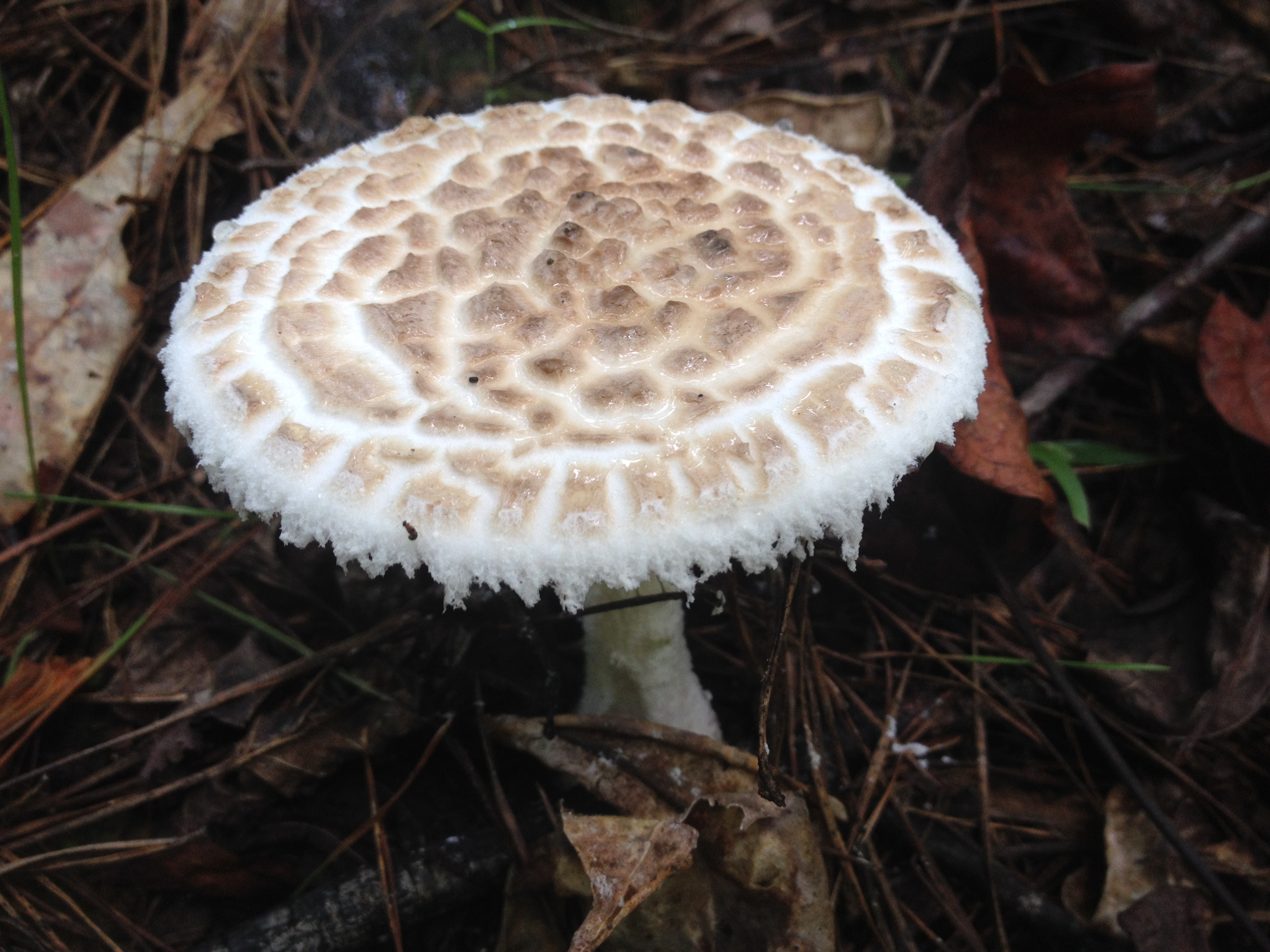

Scientific classification
- Kingdom: Fungi
- Division: Basidiomycota
- Class: Agaricomycetes
- Order: Agaricales
- Family: Amanitaceae
- Genus: Amanita
- Species: A. hesleri

Binomial name
- Amanita hesleri Bas 1969

Synonyms
- Aspidella hesleri (Bas) Vizzini & Contu (2012)

= Amanita hesleri =

Species of fungus

Amanita hesleri or Hesler's lepidella is a species of fungus in the family Amanitaceae. It is found in the southern and eastern United States from North Carolina and Tennessee to Mississippi and Texas.
