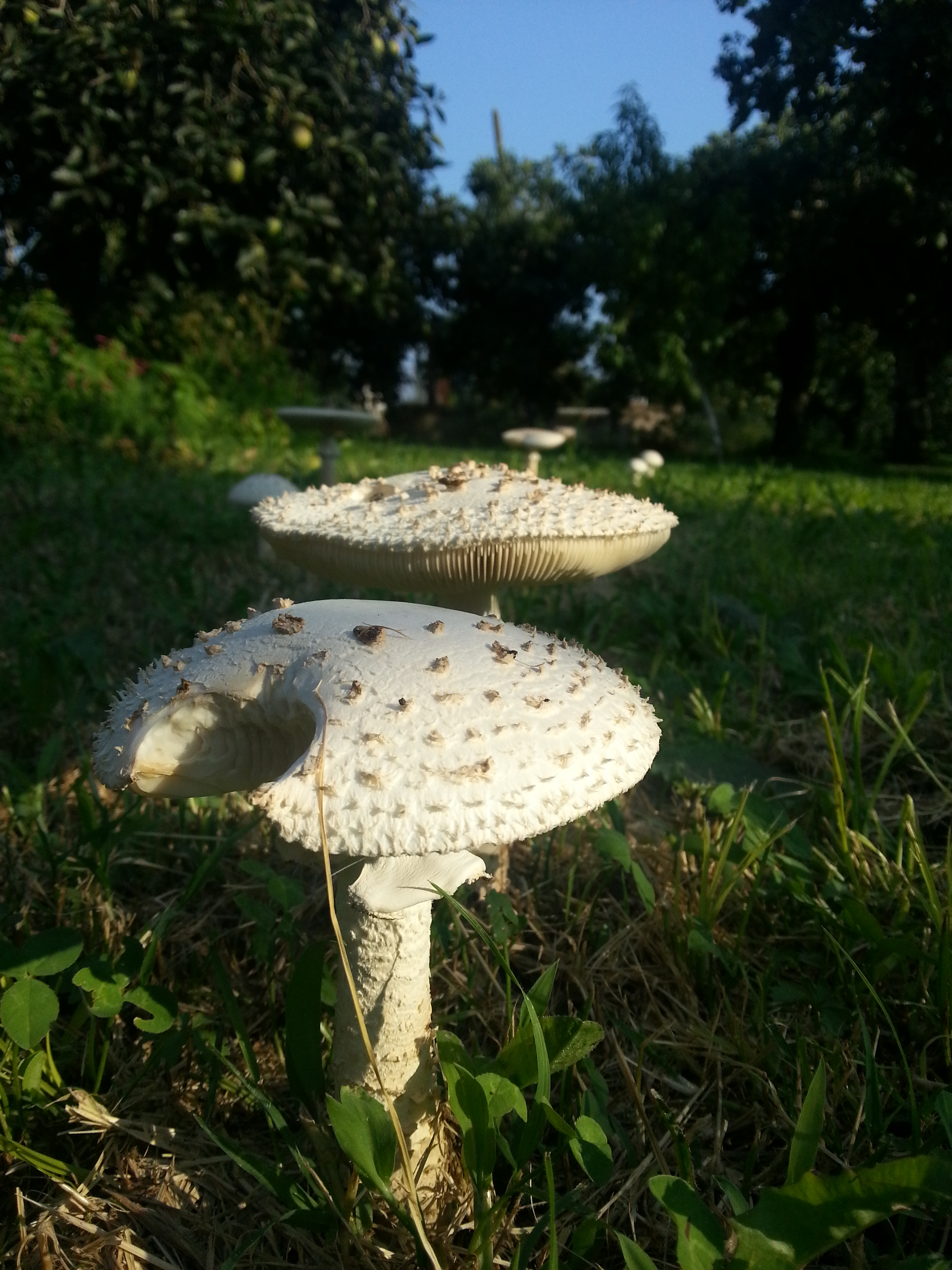
- Amanita vittadinii in grass in Italy

Scientific classification
- Kingdom: Fungi
- Division: Basidiomycota
- Class: Agaricomycetes
- Order: Agaricales
- Family: Amanitaceae
- Genus: Saproamanita
- Species: S. vittadinii

Binomial name
- Saproamanita vittadinii (Moretti) Redhead, Vizzini, Drehmel & Contu (2016)

Synonyms
- Agaricus vittadinii Moretti; Aspidella vittadinii (Moretti) E.-J.Gilbert; Lepidella vittadinii (Moretti) E.-J. Gilbert

= Saproamanita vittadinii =

Species of fungus in the family Amanitaceae

Saproamanita vittadinii
- Mycological characteristics
- Gills on hymenium
- Cap is convex
- Hymenium is free
- Stipe has a volva
- Spore print is white
- Ecology is saprotrophic
- Edibility is not recommended

Saproamanita vittadinii, commonly known as the Vittadini's lepidella, is a European saprophyte mushroom classified in the genus Saproamanita. Unlike some Amanitas, this species is known to occur without accompanying woody plant symbionts. It has a general aspect somewhat between Macrolepiota and Armillaria, but it is characterized by a pure white colour overall (whilst those genera are brownish) and by the squamous (scaly) covering of cap and stipe.

In 2019, amateur mycologist Denis Pouclet experimentally ate 30 grams (1.1 oz), fresh weight, of S. vittadinii from France without reported adverse symptoms.
