= Limacellopsis =

Scientific classification
- Kingdom: Fungi
- Division: Basidiomycota
- Class: Agaricomycetes
- Order: Agaricales
- Family: Amanitaceae
- Genus: Limacellopsis; Zhu L. Yang, Q. Cai & Y.Y. Cui (2018)

Type species
- Limacellopsis guttatus (Pers.) Zhu L. Yang, Q. Cai & Y.Y. Cui (2018)

Genus of mushroom

Limacellopsis is a genus of mushroom-forming fungi in the family Amanitaceae in order Agaricales. Analysis of DNA sequences was used to show that Limacellopsis was separate from Limacella which is similar in appearance. The name Limacellopsis means like-Limacella.
