= René Maire =

French botanist and mycologist

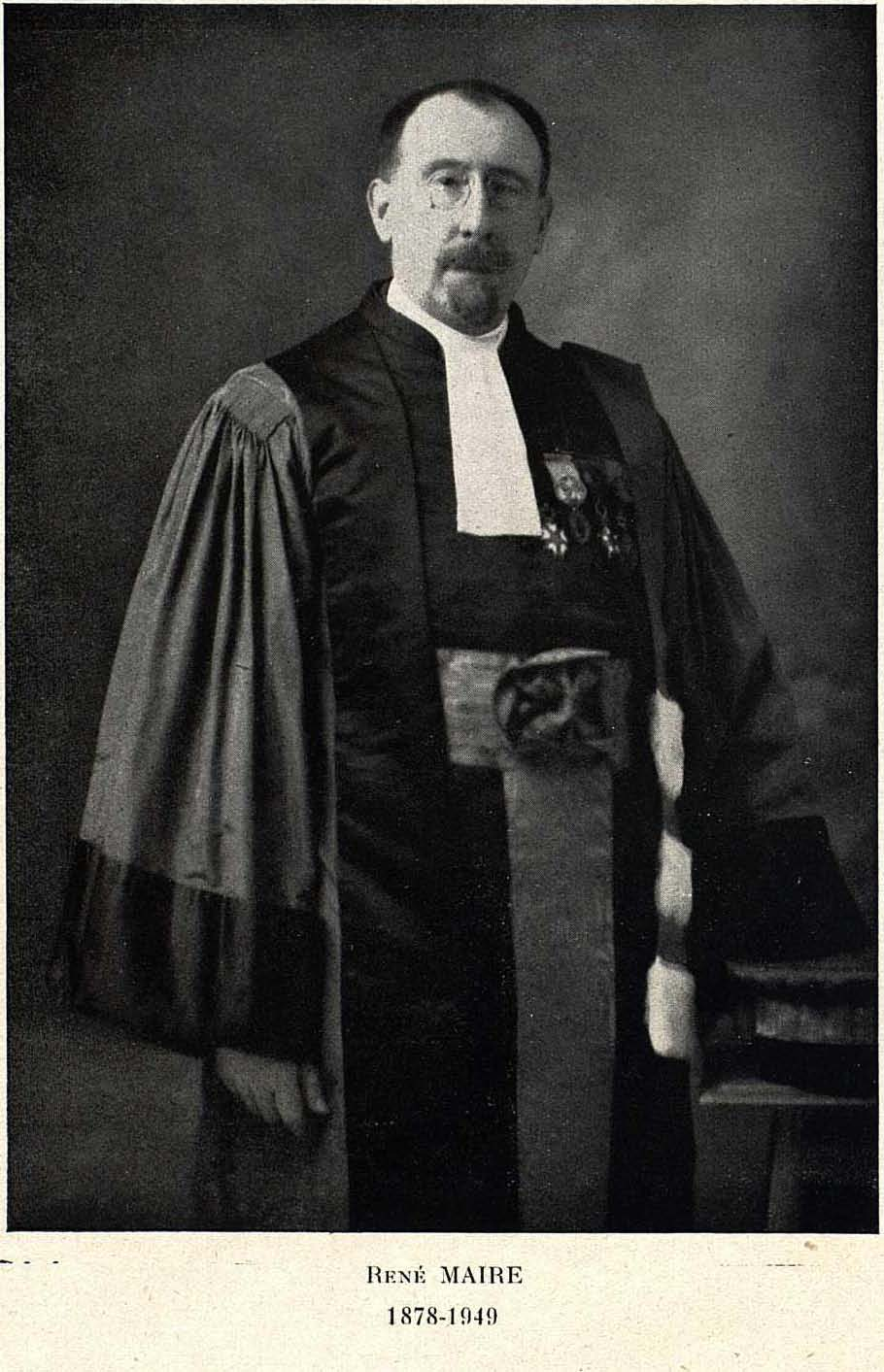
René Maire

René Charles Joseph Ernest Maire (French pronunciation: [ʁəne ʃaʁl ʒozɛf ɛʁnɛst mɛʁ]; 29 May 1878, Lons-le-Saunier – 24 November 1949) was a French botanist and mycologist. His major work was the Flore de l'Afrique du Nord in 16 volumes published posthumously in 1953. He collected plants from Algeria, Morocco, France, and Mali for the herbarium of the National Botanic Garden of Belgium.

== Biography ==
His botanical career began very early. At 18, he penned a work on the local flora of the Haute-Saône, currently on display at the Natural History Museum of Gray. He collected plants for study in Algeria and Morocco between 1902 and 1904. After obtaining his PhD in 1905, he was a professor of botany at the Faculty of Sciences in Algiers starting in 1911 where he specialised in phytopathology. He was put in charge of botanical research by the Moroccan government and was responsible for botanical studies in the Central Sahara. He was a member of a number of institutions, including the Société mycologique de France and the Société d'histoire naturelle de la Moselle based in Metz, which he joined in 1897 at the start of his career. He was the author of numerous works, including important contributions between 1918 and 1931 on the flora of North Africa. Maire issued the exsiccatae Exsiccata Hypodermearum Galliae orientalis 1896 with succeeding series and Mycotheca Boreali-Africana (1912–1919). He ended his career as the Rector of the University of Algiers. His magnum opus was The Flora of North Africa, a 16-volume work published posthumously in 1953.

== Named species ==
Among species he named or renamed are:

- Amanita codinae (Maire) Singer
- Argyrocytisus battandieri (Maire) Raynaud
- Campanula monodiana Maire
- Gymnopilus sapineus (Fr.) Maire
- Hygrophoropsis aurantiaca (Wulfen: Fr.) Maire
- Hygrophorus reai Maire
- Hypomyces vuilleminianus Maire
- Laccaria bicolor (Maire) P.D. Orton
- Lentinellus vulpinus (Fr.) Maire & Kühner
- Psathyrella candolleana (Fr.) Maire
- Psathyrella hydrophila (Fr.) Maire
- Xeromphalina campanella (Bataille: Fr.) Maire & Kühner

He also erected the family Paxillaceae, noting its affinities with boletes, in 1902, based on anatomical similarities. This was confirmed many years later by molecular studies firmly placing the genera Paxillus and Gyrodon at the base of the clade containing the members of the genus Boletus.

=== Legacy ===
The French Academy of Sciences awarded him the Prix Montagne for 1903.

Several species were named in his honour, including fungi, such as the beechwood sickener (Russula mairei), Maireella (which is a genus of fungi in the class Dothideomycetes), René Maire's ringless Amanita (Amanita mairei) from Egypt, Clitocybe mairei, Conocybe mairei, Clavicorona mairei, Cortinarius mairei, Galerina mairei, Hemimycena mairei, and Lactarius mairei, among others, as well as some North African plants such as the ornamental grass Atlas fescue (Festuca mairei). The genus Mairetis from the Canary Islands and Morocco, (in the Boraginaceae family) is also named after him.

Species names for Maire typically end in.

== See also ==
- Category:Taxa named by René Maire
