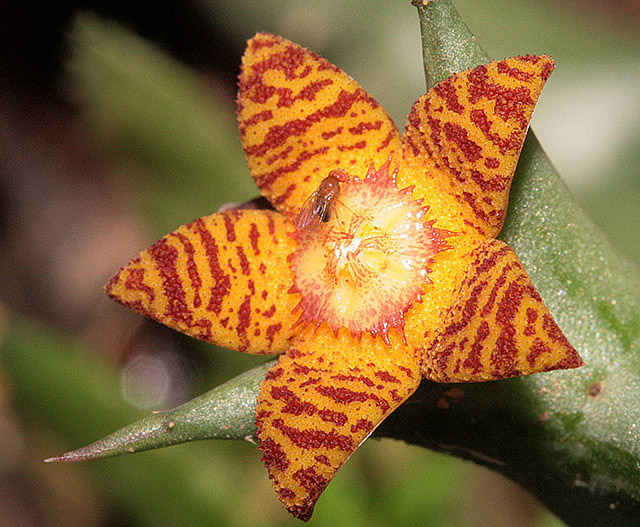
- Orbea schweinfurthii

Scientific classification
- Kingdom: Plantae
- Clade: Tracheophytes
- Clade: Angiosperms
- Clade: Eudicots
- Clade: Asterids
- Order: Gentianales
- Family: Apocynaceae
- Subfamily: Asclepiadoideae
- Tribe: Ceropegieae
- Genus: Orbea; Haw.

Synonyms
- Angolluma R.Munster; Diplocyatha N.E.Br.; Orbeanthus L.C.Leach; Orbeopsis L.C.Leach; Pachycymbium L.C.Leach; Podanthes Haw.; Stapeliopsis E.Phillips; Stultitia E.Phillips

= Orbea (plant) =

Genus of flowering plants

Orbea is a genus of flowering plants of the family Apocynaceae, first described as a genus in 1812. It is native to Africa and the Arabian Peninsula.

Species

Species accepted by the Plants of the World Online as of February 2023:

- Orbea abayensis (M.G.Gilbert) Bruyns - Ethiopia
- Orbea albocastanea (Marloth) Bruyns - Great Namaqualand in Namibia
- Orbea araysiana (Lavranos & Bilaidi) Bruyns
- Orbea baldratii (A.C.White & B.Sloane) Bruyns - Eritrea
- Orbea carnosa (Stent) Bruyns - Limpopo, Mpumalanga
- Orbea caudata (N.E.Br.) Bruyns
- Orbea chrysostephana (Deflers) Bruyns
- Orbea ciliata (Thunb.) L.C.Leach - South Africa
- Orbea circes (M.G.Gilbert) Bruyns
- Orbea conjuncta (A.C.White & B.Sloane) Bruyns
- Orbea cooperi (N.E.Br.) L.C.Leach - South Africa
- Orbea cucullata (Plowes) Meve
- Orbea decaisneana (Lem.) Bruyns - Senegal
- Orbea deflersiana (Lavranos) Bruyns
- Orbea denboefii (Lavranos) Bruyns - Kenya
- Orbea distincta (E.A.Bruce) Bruyns - Tanzania
- Orbea dummeri (N.E.Br.) Bruyns - Uganda, Ethiopia
- Orbea fenestrata (Plowes) Meve
- Orbea gemugofana (M.G.Gilbert) Bruyns
- Orbea gerstneri (Letty) Bruyns - KwaZulu-Natal
- Orbea gilbertii (Plowes) Bruyns
- Orbea halipedicola L.C.Leach - Mozambique
- Orbea hardyi (R.A.Dyer) Bruyns
- Orbea huernioides (P.R.O.Bally) Bruyns
- Orbea huillensis (Hiern) Bruyns - tropical Africa
- Orbea knobelii (E.Phillips) Bruyns - Botswana
- Orbea laikipiensis (M.G.Gilbert) Bruyns
- Orbea laticorona (M.G.Gilbert) Bruyns
- Orbea longidens (N.E.Br.) L.C.Leach - Mozambique
- Orbea lugardii (N.E.Br.) Bruyns
- Orbea luntii (N.E.Br.) Bruyns
- Orbea lutea (N.E.Br.) Bruyns - South Africa
- Orbea maculata (N.E.Br.) L.C.Leach - tropical Africa
- Orbea mcloughlinii (I.Verd.) L.C.Leach
- Orbea melanantha (Schltr.) Bruyns - South Africa
- Orbea miscella (N.E.Br.) Meve
- Orbea namaquensis (N.E.Br.) L.C.Leach - South Africa, Namibia
- Orbea nardii Raffaelli, Mosti & Tardelli
- Orbea paradoxa (I.Verd.) L.C.Leach - KwaZulu-Natal
- Orbea parviloba (Bruyns) Meve
- Orbea pulchella (Masson) L.C.Leach - South Africa
- Orbea rogersii (L.Bolus) Bruyns
- Orbea sacculata (N.E.Br.) Bruyns
- Orbea schweinfurthii (A.Berger) Bruyns - tropical Africa
- Orbea semitubiflora (L.E.Newton) Bruyns
- Orbea semota (N.E.Br.) L.C.Leach - Tanzania
- Orbea sprengeri (E.Dammann & Sprenger) Bruyns
- Orbea subterranea (E.A.Bruce & P.R.O.Bally) Bruyns
- Orbea taitica Bruyns - Kenya
- Orbea tapscottii (I.Verd.) L.C.Leach - Botswana
- Orbea tubiformis (E.A.Bruce & P.R.O.Bally) Bruyns
- Orbea umbracula (M.D.Hend.) L.C.Leach - Zimbabwe
- Orbea valida (N.E.Br.) Bruyns - Zimbabwe
- Orbea variegata (L.) Haw. - South Africa
- Orbea verrucosa (Masson) L.C.Leach - South Africa
- Orbea vibratilis (E.A.Bruce & P.R.O.Bally) Bruyns
- Orbea wilsonii (P.R.O.Bally) Bruyns
- Orbea wissmannii (O.Schwartz) Bruyns
- Orbea woodii (N.E.Br.) L.C.Leach - KwaZulu-Natal
