= Catatrama =

Scientific classification
- Kingdom: Fungi
- Division: Basidiomycota
- Class: Agaricomycetes
- Order: Agaricales
- Family: Amanitaceae
- Genus: Catatrama; Franco-Mol. (1991)

Type species
- Catatrama costaricensis Franco-Mol. (1991)

Genus of fungi

Catatrama is a fungal genus in the family Amanitaceae, order Agaricales. Originally a monotypic genus with Catatrama costaricensis, found in Quercus pilarius forest in Costa Rica. In 2007, the species was reported from Brazil. Since then 2 additional species, one from Australia and one from India have been recognized.

== See also ==
- List of Agaricales genera
