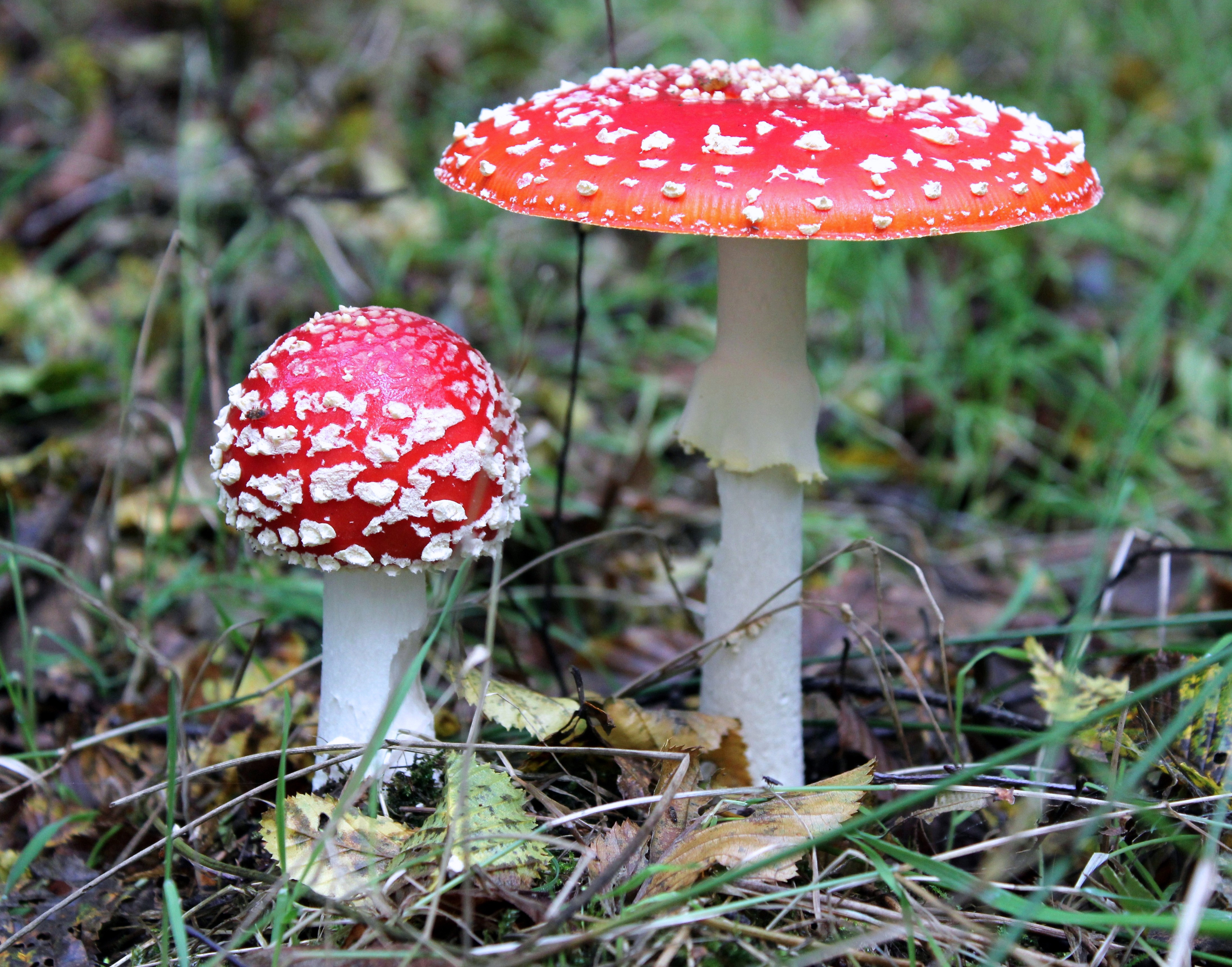
- Amanita muscaria

Scientific classification
- Kingdom: Fungi
- Division: Basidiomycota
- Class: Agaricomycetes
- Order: Agaricales
- Family: Amanitaceae; E.-J. Gilbert (1940)

Type genus
- Amanita Pers. (1794)

Genera
- Amanita; Catatrama; Limacella; Limacellopsis; Saproamanita; Zhuliangomyces

= Amanitaceae =

Family of fungi

The Amanitaceae are a family of mushroom-forming fungi. The family, also commonly called the amanita family, is in order Agaricales, the gilled mushrooms. The family consists primarily of the large genus Amanita, but also includes the smaller genera Catatrama, Limacella, Limacellopsis, Saproamanita, and Zhuliangomyces.

The species are usually found in woodlands. The most characteristic emerge from an egg-like structure formed by the universal veil.

This family contains several species valued for edibility and flavor, and other deadly poisonous ones. More than half the cases of mushroom poisoning stem from members of this family. The most toxic members of this group have names that warn of the poisonous nature, but others, of varying degrees of toxicity, do not.

== Some notable species ==
- Amanita caesarea, Caesar's mushroom
- Amanita muscaria, fly agaric
- Amanita rubescens, blusher
- Amanita pantherina, panther cap
- Amanita phalloides, death cap.
- Amanita velosa, orange spring amanita.
- Amanita virosa, destroying angel

== See also ==
- List of Agaricales families
- List of Amanita species
- List of Basidiomycota families
