= List of Lepiota species =

The following is an incomplete list of species in the agaric genus Lepiota. The genus has a widespread distribution, and contains about 400 species. Some species, such as L. aspera, have now been separated off into the newer genus Echinoderma.

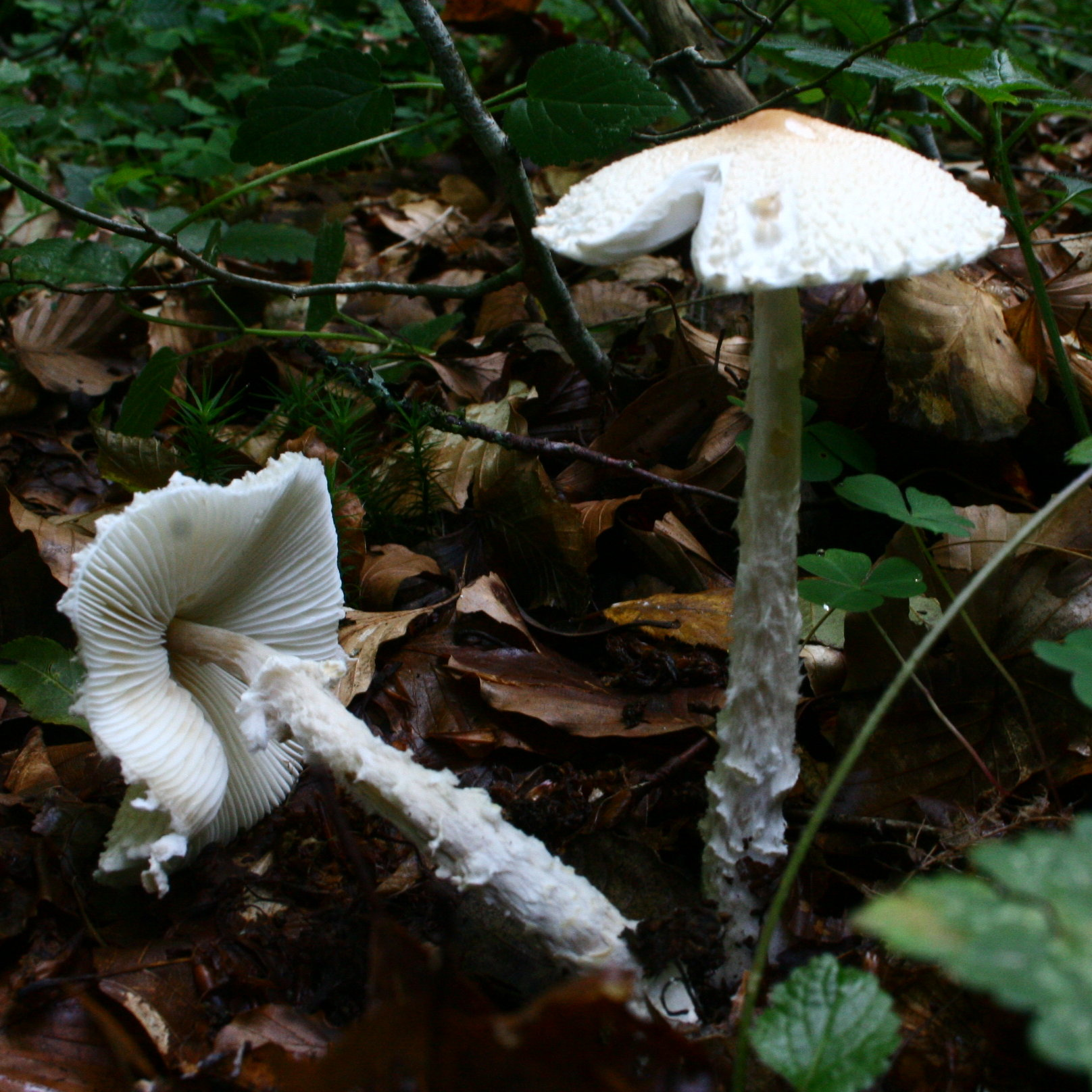
Lepiota clypeolaria, the type species of Lepiota

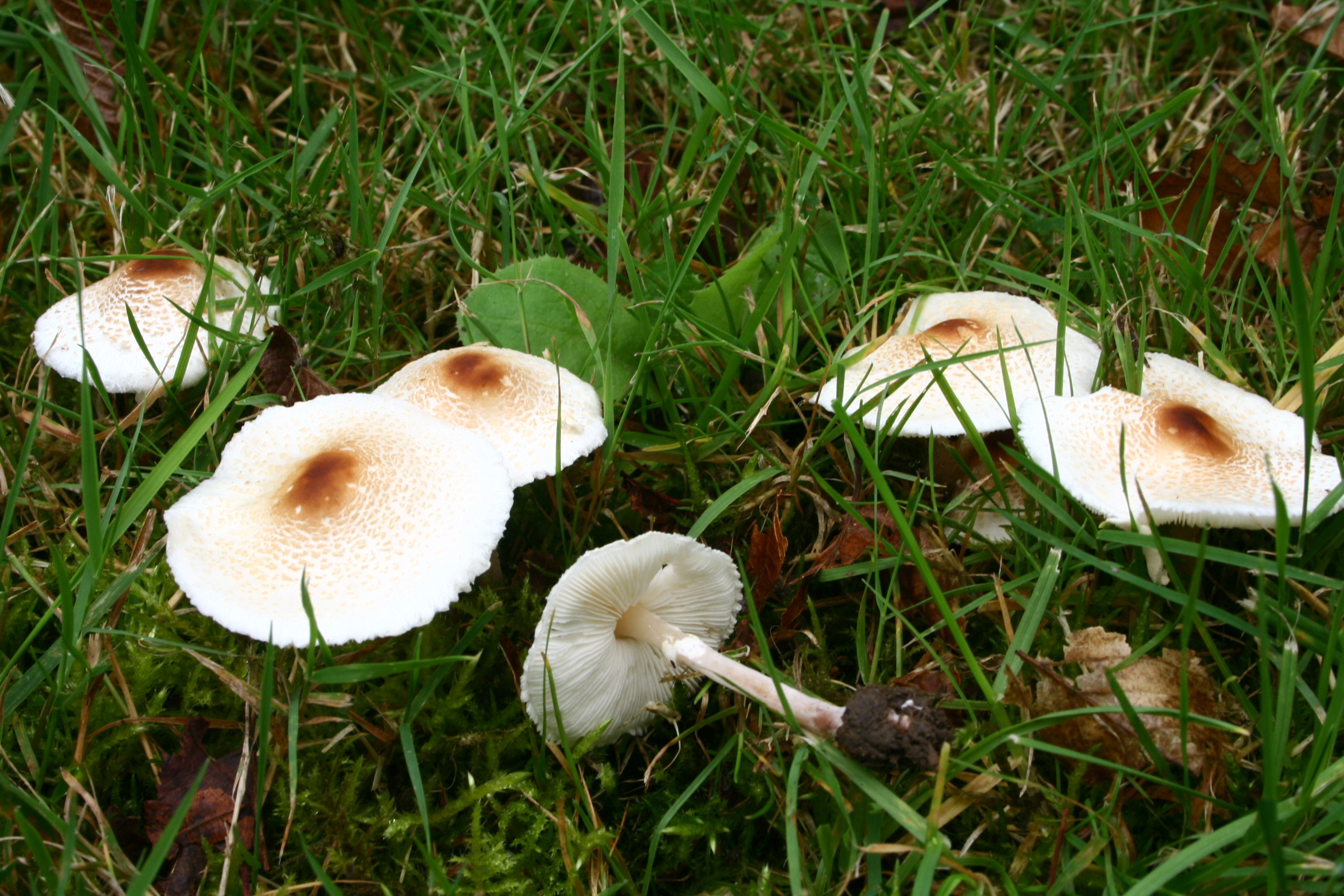
Lepiota cristata

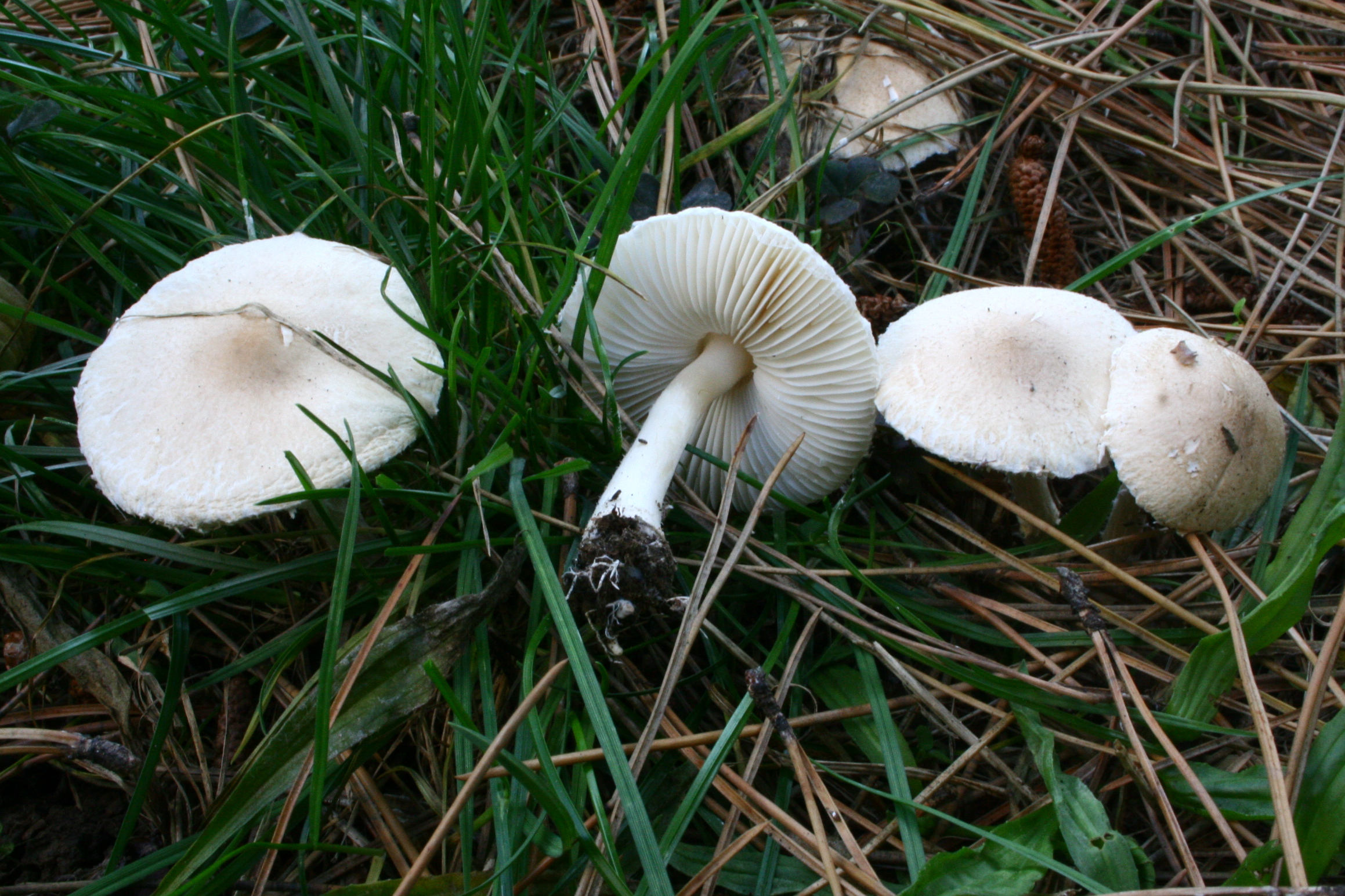
Lepiota oreadiformis

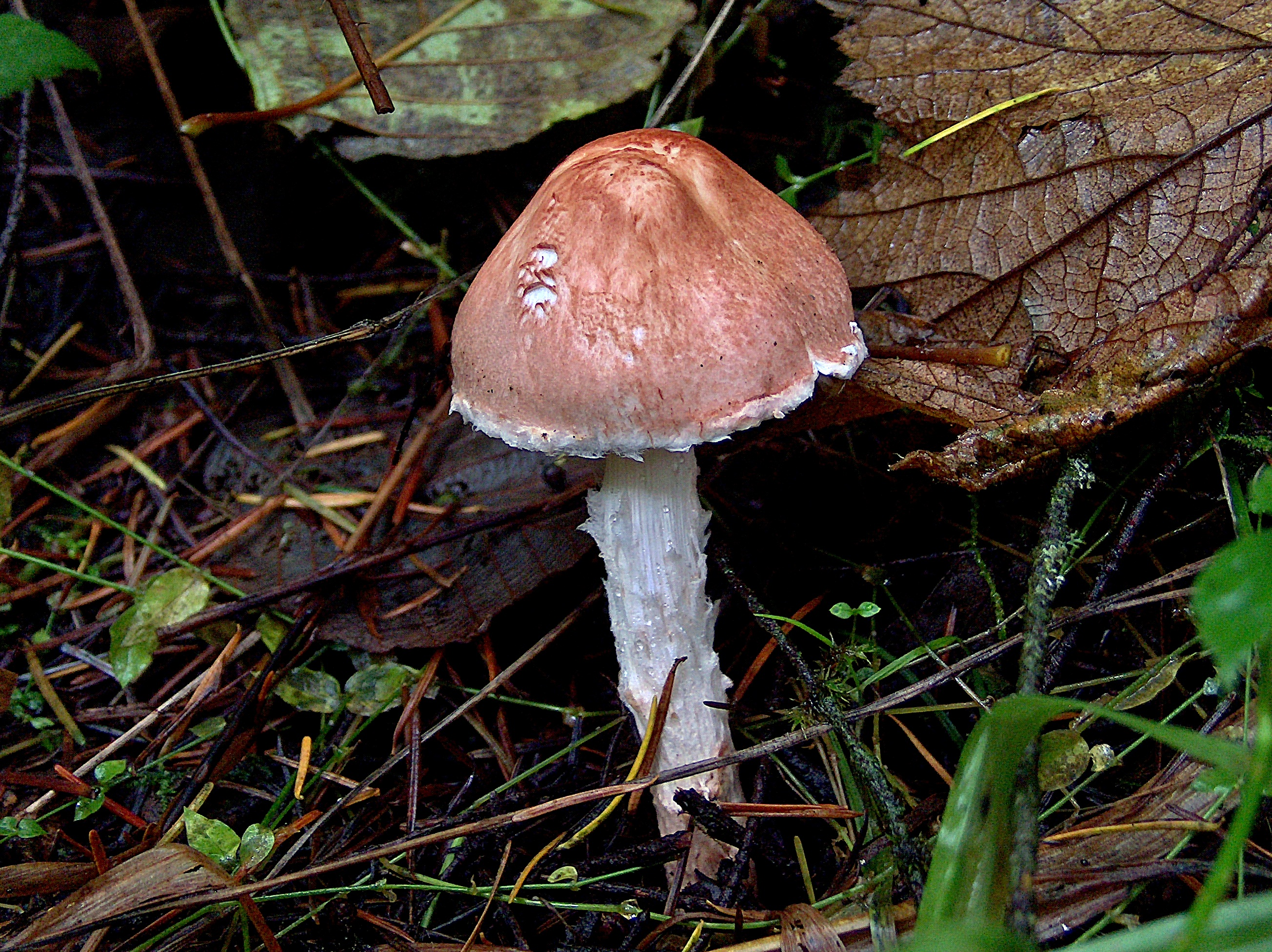
Lepiota subincarnata

- Lepiota abruptibulba Murrill – Cuba
- Lepiota acerina Peck – New York
- Lepiota acicularis Velen. – Czech Republic
- Lepiota adusta (E. Horak) E. Horak – New Zealand
- Lepiota aeruginea Murrill – Florida
- Lepiota affinis Velen. –
- Lepiota alba Beeli – Congo
- Lepiota albiceps Pat. & Gaillard – Venezuela
- Lepiota albida Massee – Singapore
- Lepiota albocitrina Pat. – Tonkin
- Lepiota albofibrillosa Cleland – Australia
- Lepiota albosericea Henn. – Germany
- Lepiota albosquamosa Rick – Brazil
- Lepiota allenae Peck – Massachusetts
- Lepiota alliciens (Berk.) Sacc. – India
- Lepiota alluviina (Peck) Morgan – New York
- Lepiota alopochroa (Berk. & Broome) Sacc.
- Lepiota altissima Massee – India
- Lepiota amanitiformis Murrill – USA
- Lepiota amanitoides Beeli – Congo
- Lepiota amara Beeli – Congo
- Lepiota amplifolia Murrill – Oregon
- Lepiota amyloidea Singer – Altai
- Lepiota amylospora Malençon – 1970
- Lepiota ananya T.K.A. Kumar & Manim. – India, Kerala State
- Lepiota anax (Berk.) Sacc. – India
- Lepiota anceps Rick– Brazil
- Lepiota andegavensis Mornand –
- Lepiota anomala Murrill – Florida
- Lepiota anthomyces (Berk. & Broome) Sacc. – Sri Lanka
- Lepiota anupama T.K.A. Kumar & Manim. – India, Kerala State
- Lepiota apalochroa (Berk. & Broome) Sacc.
- Lepiota apatelia Vellinga & Huijser – The Netherlands
- Lepiota apicipigmentata A.B. Pereira – Brazil
- Lepiota araucariicola A.B. Pereira – Brazil
- Lepiota arenicola Peck – New York
- Lepiota areolata Wichansky – Czechoslovakia
- Lepiota argentina Raithelh. – Argentina
- Lepiota aspera (Pers. : Fr.) Quél. (= Echinoderma asperum (Pers.) Bon)
- Lepiota aspericeps Murrill – Florida
- Lepiota asperiformis Murrill – Florida
- Lepiota asperula G.F. Atk. – USA
- Lepiota aspratella Murrill – Jamaica
- Lepiota atra Beeli – Congo
- Lepiota atrata E. Horak – New Caledonia
- Lepiota atricapilla Sacc. – South Africa
- Lepiota atrocrocea (Massee) W.G.Sm. – United Kingdom
- Lepiota atrodisca Zeller – Oregon
- Lepiota atrorupta Rick – Brazil
- Lepiota atrosquamulosa Hongo – Japan
- Lepiota atrovinosa S. Imai – Japan
- Lepiota aucta (Berk. & M.A. Curtis) Sacc. – Hong Kong
- Lepiota aurantiaca Henn. – Java, Indonesia
- Lepiota aurantioflava Hongo – Japan
- Lepiota aureoconspersa Rick – San Salvador
- Lepiota aureofloccosa Henn.
- Lepiota aureoviolacea Henn. – Cameroon
- Lepiota aurora Murrill – Florida
- Lepiota australiana Fr. – Australia
- Lepiota azalearum (Murrill) Dennis – Florida
- Lepiota azurea Singer – Argentina
- Lepiota babruka
- Lepiota babruzalka
- Lepiota bickhamensis
- Lepiota boertmannii (= Echinoderma boertmannii)
- Lepiota boudieri
- Lepiota brunneoincarnata
- Lepiota brunneolilacea
- Lepiota calcarata
- Lepiota calcicola = Echinoderma calcicola
- Lepiota carinii = Echinoderma carinii
- Lepiota castanea
- Lepiota castaneidisca
- Lepiota cingulum
- Lepiota clypeolaria
- Lepiota coloratipes – Europe, China
- Lepiota cortinarius
- Lepiota coxheadii
- Lepiota cristata
- Lepiota cristatanea J.F.Liang & Zhu L.Yang – China
- Lepiota cystophoroides
- Lepiota decorata (Zeller, 1929)
- Lepiota echinacea = Echinoderma echinaceum
- Lepiota echinella
- Lepiota efibulis = Echinoderma efibulis
- Lepiota erminea
- Lepiota exstructa
- Lepiota felina
- Lepiota forquignonii
- Lepiota fuscovinacea
- Lepiota geogenia
- Lepiota grangei
- Lepiota griseovirens
- Lepiota harithaka
- Lepiota helveola
- Lepiota hymenoderma
- Lepiota hystrix = Echinoderma hystrix
- Lepiota ignivolvata
- Lepiota jacobi = Echinoderma jacobi
- Lepiota kuehneri
- Lepiota lilacea
- Lepiota locquinii
- Lepiota maculans
- Lepiota magnispora
- Lepiota medullata
- Lepiota mesomorpha
- Lepiota micropholis
- Lepiota neophana
- Lepiota nigromarginata
- Lepiota nigrosquamosa
- Lepiota nirupama
- Lepiota obscura
- Lepiota ochraceofulva
- Lepiota oreadiformis
- Lepiota parvannulata
- Lepiota perplexa = Echinoderma perplexum
- Lepiota phaeoderma Vellinga – USA
- Lepiota phlyctaenodes
- Lepiota pseudoasperula = Echinoderma pseudoasperulum
- Lepiota pseudolilacea
- Lepiota punjabensis N.J. Kaur, M. Kaur and N.S. Atri – India
- Lepiota purpurata
- Lepiota rubella = Echinoderma rubellum
- Lepiota rufipes
- Lepiota saponella M.Bodin & Priou – France
- Lepiota sardoa (Padovan & Contu) Vila & Castellón - Italy
- Lepiota shveta
- Lepiota spheniscispora
- Lepiota subalba
- Lepiota subgracilis
- Lepiota subincarnata
- Lepiota thiersii
- Lepiota tomentella
- Lepiota vellingana
- Lepiota viridigleba
- Lepiota xanthophylla
- Lepiota zalkavritha
