= Lepiota babruzalka =

Scientific classification
- Domain: Eukaryota
- Kingdom: Fungi
- Division: Basidiomycota
- Class: Agaricomycetes
- Order: Agaricales
- Family: Agaricaceae
- Genus: Lepiota
- Species: L. babruzalka

Binomial name
- Lepiota babruzalka T.K.A.Kumar & Manim. (2009)
- Known only from Kerala State, India

Species of fungus

Lepiota babruzalka is an agaric mushroom of the genus Lepiota in the order Agaricales. Described as new to science in 2009, it is found in Kerala State, India, where it grows on the ground in litterfall around bamboo stems. Fruit bodies have caps that measure up to 1.3 cm (0.5 in) in diameter, and are covered with reddish-brown scales. The cap is supported by a long and slender stem up to 4.5 cm (1.8 in) long and 1.5 millimetres (0.1 in) thick. One of the distinguishing microscopic features of the species is the variably shaped cystidia found on the edges of the gills.

== Taxonomy ==
The species was first described by Arun Kumar Thirovoth Kottuvetta and P. Manimohan in the journal Mycotaxon in 2009, in a survey of the genus Lepiota in Kerala State in southern India. The holotype collection was made in 2004 in Chelavur, located in the Kozhikode District; it is now kept in the herbarium of Kew Gardens. The specific epithet babruzalka derives from the Sanskrit word for "brown-scaled".

== Description ==
The fruit bodies of Lepiota babruzalka have caps that start out roughly spherical, and as they expand become broadly convex, and eventually flat, with a blunt umbo. The cap attains a diameter of 1–1.3 cm (0.4–0.5 in). Its whitish surface is covered with small, reddish-brown, pressed-down scales that are more numerous in the center. The margin is initially curved inward, but straightens out in age, and retains hanging remnants of the partial veil. The gills are white, and free from attachment to the stem. They are crowded together, with two or three tiers of interspersed lamellulae (short gills that do not extend fully from the cap edge to the stem). Viewed with a hand lens, the edges of the gills appear to be fringed. The stem is cylindrical with a bulbous base, initially solid before becoming hollow, and measures 2.6–4.5 cm (1.0–1.8 in) long by 1–1.5 mm thick. The stem surface is whitish, but will stain a light brown color if handled. In young fruit bodies, the stems have a whitish, membranous ring on the upper half, but the ring does not last long before disintegrating. The flesh is thin (up to 1 mm), whitish, and lacks any appreciable odor.

Lepiota babruzalka produces a white spore print. Spores are roughly elliptical to somewhat cylindrical, hyaline (translucent), and measure 5.5–10.5 by 3.5–4.5 μm. They are thick-walled and contain a refractive oil droplet. The basidia (spore-bearing cells) are club-shaped, hyaline, and are one- to four-spored with sterigmata up to 8 μm long; the dimensions of the basidia are 15–20 by 7–8 μm. Cheilocystidia (cystidia on the edge of the gill) are plentiful, and can assume a number of shapes, including cylindrical to club-shaped, utriform (like a wineskin bottle), to ventricose-rostrate (where the basal and middle portions are swollen and the apex extends into a beak-like protrusion). The cheilocystidia are thin-walled, and measure 13–32 by 7–12 μm; there are no cystidia on the gill faces (pleurocystidia).

The gill tissue is made of thin-walled hyphae containing a septum, which are hyaline to pale yellow, and measure 3–15 μm wide. The cap tissue comprises interwoven, inflated hyphae with widths between 2 and 25 μm. Neither the gill tissue nor the cap tissue show any color reaction when stained with Melzer's reagent. Clamp connections are rare in the hyphae of Lepiota babruzalka.

=== Similar species ===
According to the authors, the only Lepiota bearing a close resemblance to L. babruzalka is L. roseoalba, an edible mushroom described by Paul Christoph Hennings in 1891. Found in Africa and Iran, L. roseoalba lacks the reddish-brown scales on the cap, has radial grooves on the cap margin, and its stem is not as slender as those of L. babruzalka.

== Habitat and distribution ==
Fruit bodies of Lepiota babruzalka grow singly or scattered on the ground among decaying leaf litter around the base of bamboo stands. The species has been documented only from Chelavur and Nilambur in the Kozhikode and Malappuram Districts of Kerala State. As of 2009, there are 22 Lepiota taxa (21 species and 1 variety) known from Kerala, which is recognized as a biodiversity hotspot.

== See also ==
- List of Lepiota species
