= Lepiota zalkavritha =

Scientific classification
- Domain: Eukaryota
- Kingdom: Fungi
- Division: Basidiomycota
- Class: Agaricomycetes
- Order: Agaricales
- Family: Agaricaceae
- Genus: Lepiota
- Species: L. zalkavritha

Binomial name
- Lepiota zalkavritha T.K.A.Kumar & Manim. (2009)
- Found only in the Kozhikode District of Kerala State, India

Species of fungus

Lepiota zalkavritha is an agaric fungus of the genus Lepiota, order Agaricales. Described as new to science in 2009, it is found in Kerala State, India.

== Taxonomy ==
The species was described in 2009 in the journal Mycotaxon. The type collection was made in September 2006, in Pudiyangadi, located in the Kozhikode District of Kerala State. The specific epithet zalkavritha is from the Sanskrit words meaning "covered with scales".

== Description ==
The fruit bodies of Lepiota zalkavritha have caps that are initially roughly spherical before becoming convex and eventually flattened in maturity; the cap attains a diameter of 1.9–2.7 cm (0.75–1.06 in). The caps of young fruit bodies have an umbo, but this disappears as the cap expands. The background color of the cap surface is whitish, but it is covered with minute brown scales.

As the mushroom ages, cracks develop near the cap margin, and the cap cuticle peels off to expose the underlying white flesh. The cap margin, initially curled inward but straight in maturity, retains hanging fragments of the partial veil. The gills, free from attachment to the stem, are somewhat crowded, and have 3–5 tiers of interspersed lamellulae (short gills). Gills are whitish to yellowish-white, with finely fringed edges. The cylindrical, hollow stem measures 2.5–3.4 cm (1.0–1.3 in) by 4–5 mm (0.16–0.20 in) thick, androughly equal in width through its length except for a bulbous base.

Its color ranges from orange-white to light brown, but bruises brownish-orange when handled. The lower part of the stem has dark brown, fibrillose scales, and the base of the stem is attached to white mycelial cords. A ring is present on the central to lower part of the stem as a zone of dark brown scales. The flesh is up to 2 mm thick, and it has no distinctive odor.

Lepiota zalkavritha produces a white spore print. The spores are roughly elliptical, smooth, hyaline (translucent), and have dimensions of 4.5–6 by 3–4.5 μm. Spores contain a single oil droplet. The basidia (spore-bearing cells) are club-shaped, contain oil droplets, four-spored with sterigmata up to 4 μm long, and measure 20–25 by 6–8 μm. Cheilocystidia are numerous on the gill edge,. They are club-shaped, thin-walled, hyaline, and measure 12–32 by 5.5–10 μm, although some have an abruptly enlarged spherical "head", or an elongated tip that is up to 30 μm long; there are no cystidia on the gill faces (pleurocystidia).

== Habitat and distribution ==
Fruit bodies of Lepiota zalkavritha grow singly on the ground. The species is known only from the type locality in Pudiyangadi.

== See also ==
- List of Lepiota species
