= Lepiota nirupama =

Scientific classification
- Domain: Eukaryota
- Kingdom: Fungi
- Division: Basidiomycota
- Class: Agaricomycetes
- Order: Agaricales
- Family: Agaricaceae
- Genus: Lepiota
- Species: L. nirupama

Binomial name
- Lepiota nirupama T.K.A.Kumar & Manim. (2009)
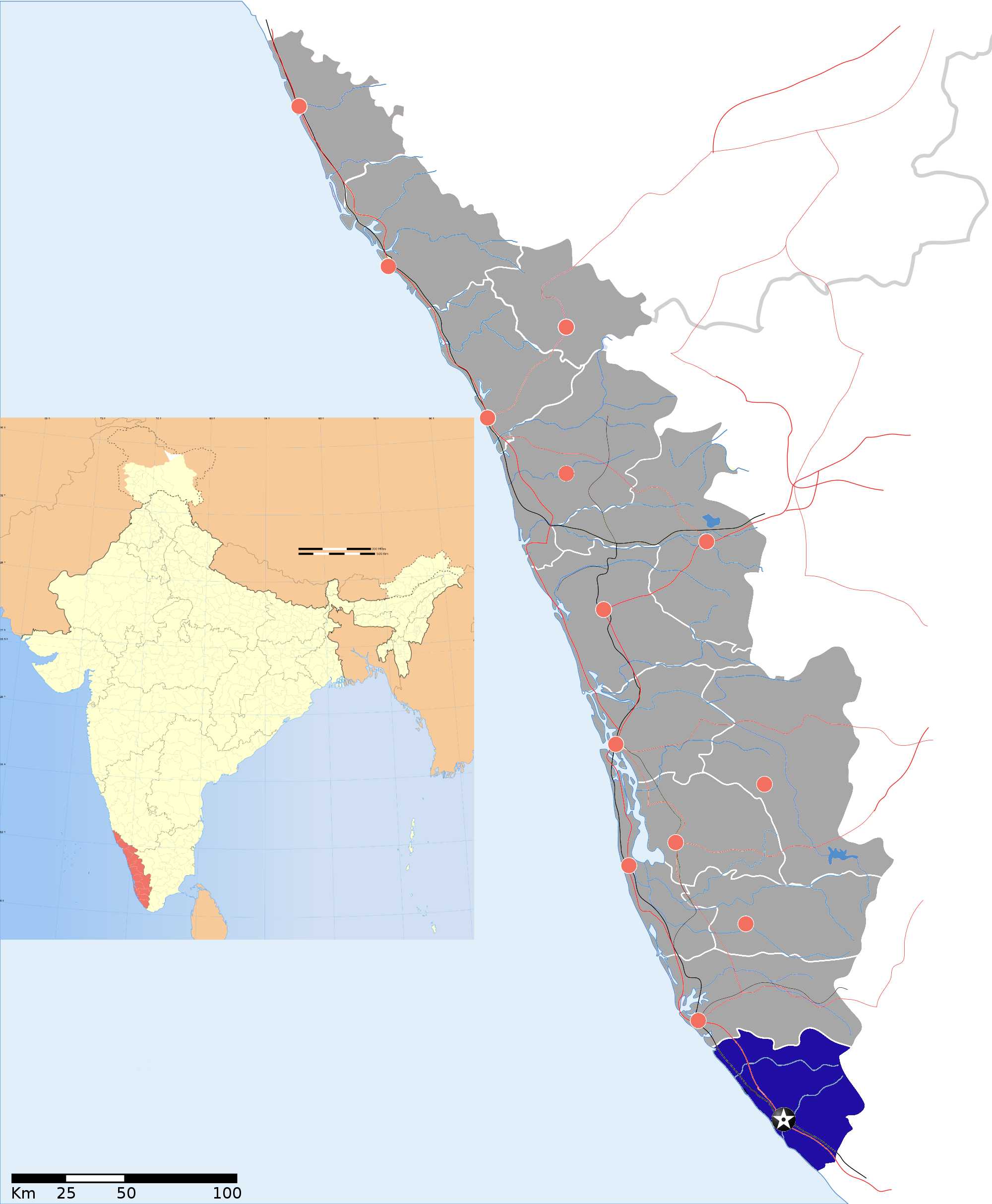
- Known only from the Thiruvananthapuram district (blue) of Kerala State (grey), India

Species of fungus

Lepiota nirupama is a species of agaric fungus of the genus Lepiota in the order Agaricales. Known only from Kerala State in India, it was described as new to science in 2009.

== Taxonomy ==
The species was described in the journal Mycotaxon in 2009 by T.K.A. Kumar and P. Manimohan. The type collections was made in July, 2005, in the Thiruvananthapuram District of Kerala State, India. The specific epithet nirupama is derived from the Sanskrit word for "unequaled".

== Description ==
Fruit bodies of Lepiota nirupama have caps that start out roughly spherical before becoming convex, ultimately reaching dimensions of 2–3 cm (0.8–1.2 in). The cap color ranges from light brown to dark brown (sometimes with reddish tones), and the surface is covered with small, wart-like to conical scales that eventually slough off to leave a reticulate (net-like) pattern. This pattern is most prevalent in the center of the cap, but diminishes toward the margin. In mature specimens, the cap cuticle peels off to reveal the underlying white flesh. The cap margin is initially curved inward but straightens out in maturity. The gills are free from attachment to the stem, and moderately crowded, with 4–5 tiers of interspersed lamellulae (short gills). The gill edges are fringed, although a hand lens may be needed to see this detail. The stem is centrally attached to the cap, hollow, and measures 3.2–4 cm (1.3–1.6 in) long by 2–5 mm (0.1–0.2 in) thick. The stem bears a whitish, membranous or fibrillose ring on its upper half that can be moved up and down. The lower surface of the ring is densely covered with fluffy whitish to light brown scales. The stem color is light brown to reddish-brown below the level of the ring, and it has small pyramidal scales scattered about its surface; above the ring, the stem is whitish. There is white mycelium at the base of the stem. The flesh of the mushroom is up to 6 mm (0.24 in) thick, and lacks any distinct odor.

Spores are smooth, elliptical, hyaline (translucent), and measure 4–6 by 3 μm. They contain refractive oil droplets. The basidia (spore-bearing cells) are cylindrical to club-shaped, hyaline, four-spored with sterigmata up to 2 μm long, and measure 15–20 by 6–8 μm. Cheilocystidia are plentiful, thin-walled, club-shaped or sac-like with a pedicel, and have dimensions of 10–34 by 7–20 μm; there are no cystidia on the gill faces (pleurocystidia).

== Habitat and distribution ==
The fruit bodies of Lepiota nirupama grow singly to scattered on the ground among bamboo roots both dead and living. It is known only from the type locality.

== See also ==
- List of Lepiota species
