= Lepiota saponella =

Scientific classification
- Domain: Eukaryota
- Kingdom: Fungi
- Division: Basidiomycota
- Class: Agaricomycetes
- Order: Agaricales
- Family: Agaricaceae
- Genus: Lepiota
- Species: L. saponella

Binomial name
- Lepiota saponella M.Bodin & Priou (1994)

Species of fungus

Lepiota saponella is a species of agaric fungus in the family Agaricaceae. Found in France, it was described as new to science in 1994.

The fruit bodies (mushrooms) closely resemble those of the widespread species Lepiota cristata. L. saponella can be distinguished by its soapy smell, dingy buff-coloured gills, and smaller scales on the cap surface. Microscopically, its spores are more triangular than those of L. cristata.

== See also ==
- List of Lepiota species
