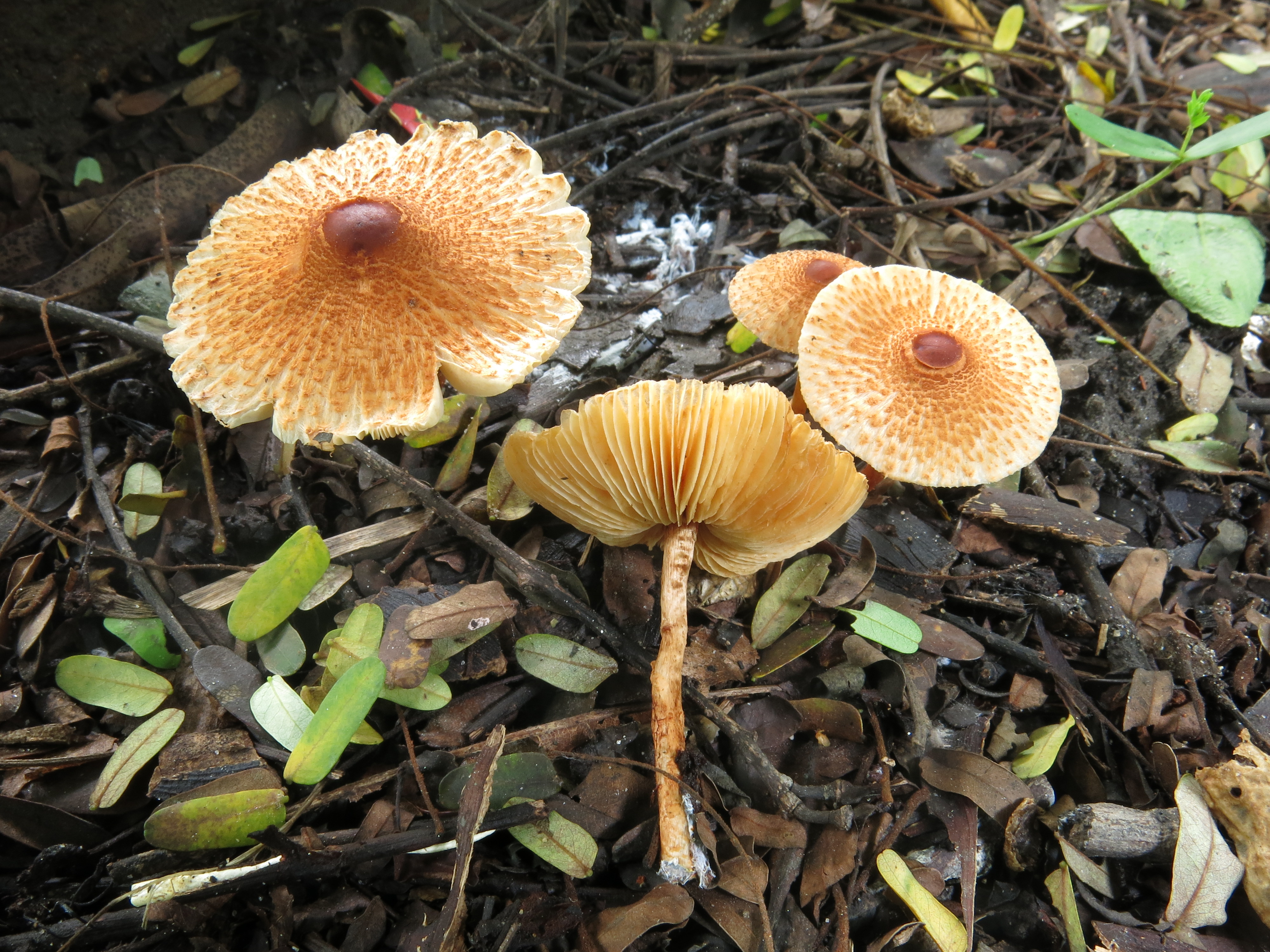

Scientific classification
- Domain: Eukaryota
- Kingdom: Fungi
- Division: Basidiomycota
- Class: Agaricomycetes
- Order: Agaricales
- Family: Agaricaceae
- Genus: Lepiota
- Species: L. bengalensis

Binomial name
- Lepiota bengalensis Iqbal Hosen & Li T.H.(2016)

= Lepiota bengalensis =

Species of fungus

Lepiota bengalensis is a species of the fungal family Agaricaceae. It was the first generic report for Bangladesh, described as a new species to science in 2016. It is only known from Bangladesh.

== See also ==
- List of Lepiota species
