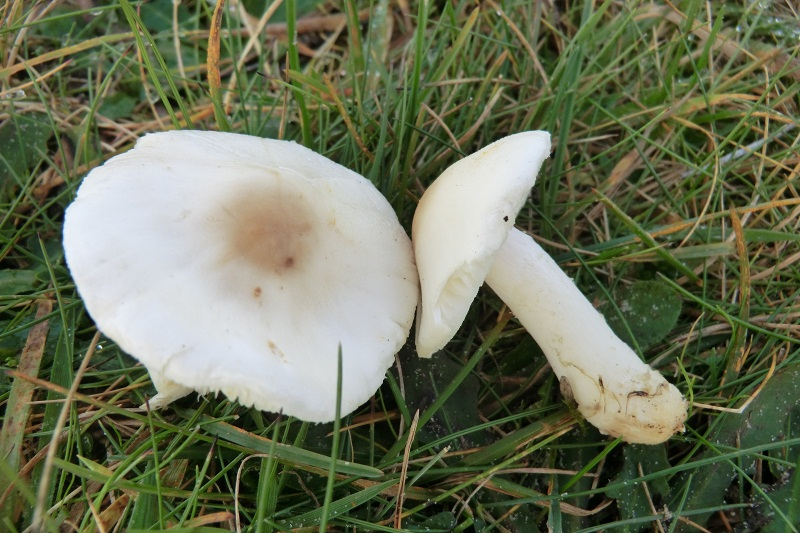

Scientific classification
- Kingdom: Fungi
- Division: Basidiomycota
- Class: Agaricomycetes
- Order: Agaricales
- Family: Agaricaceae
- Genus: Lepiota
- Species: L. erminea

Binomial name
- Lepiota erminea (Fr.) P.Kumm. (1871)

Synonyms
- Agaricus ermineus Fr. (1821); Lepiota clypeolaria var. alba Bres. (1881); Lepiota alba (Bres.) Sacc. (1887); Mastocephalus ermineus (Fr.) Kuntze (1891); Lepiota alba f. silvatica Bon (1993)

= Lepiota erminea =

Species of fungus

Lepiota erminea, commonly known as the dune dapperling, is a species of agaric fungus in the family Agaricaceae. It is found in Europe and North America.

== See also ==
- List of Lepiota species
