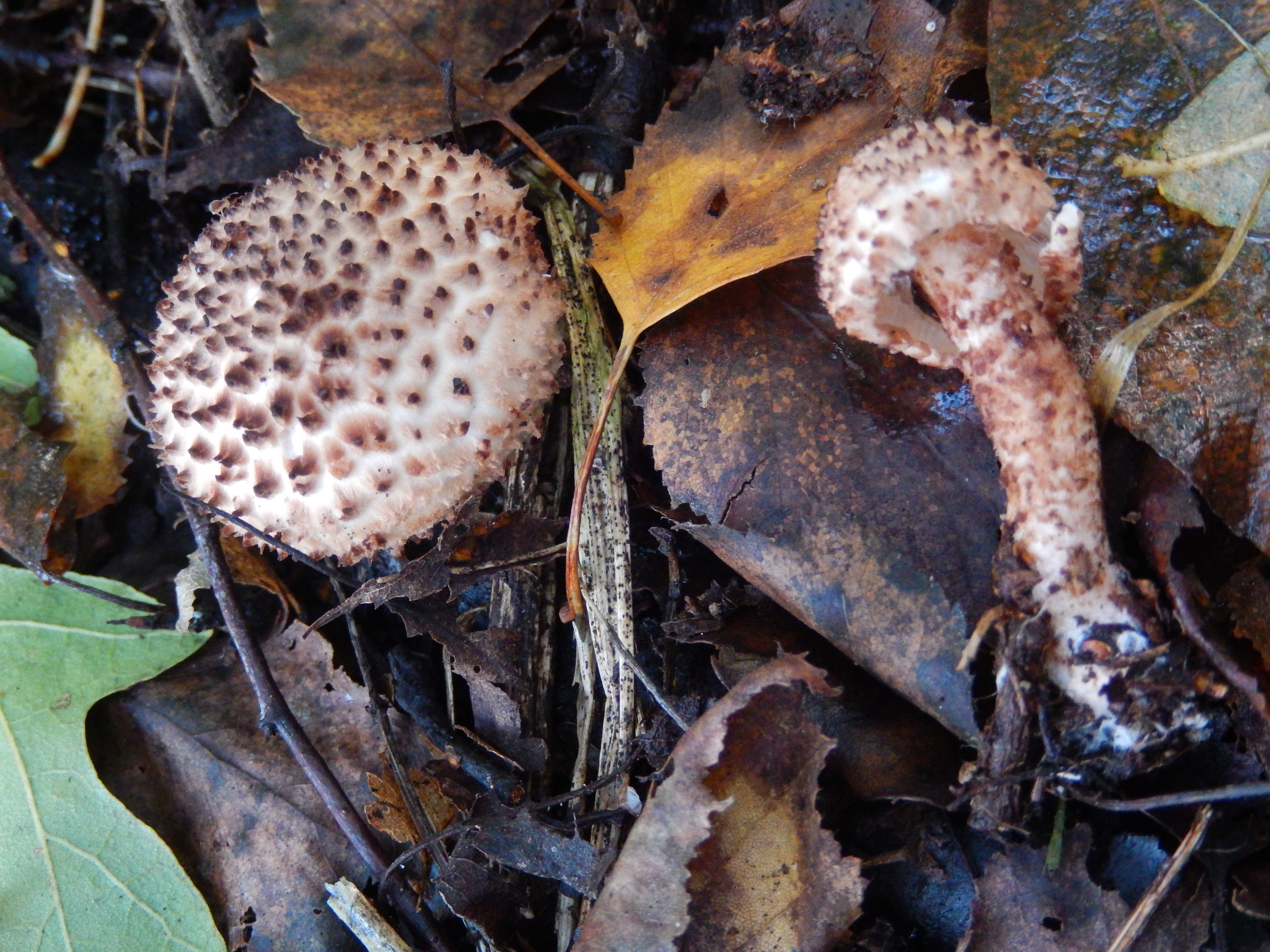

Scientific classification
- Domain: Eukaryota
- Kingdom: Fungi
- Division: Basidiomycota
- Class: Agaricomycetes
- Order: Agaricales
- Family: Agaricaceae
- Genus: Lepiota
- Species: L. hystrix

Binomial name
- Lepiota hystrix F.H. Møller & J.E. Lange, 1940

= Lepiota hystrix =

Species of fungus

Lepiota hystrix is a species of fungus belonging to the family Agaricaceae.

It is native to Northern Europe and Japan.
