= Lepiota atrodisca =

Scientific classification
- Domain: Eukaryota
- Kingdom: Fungi
- Division: Basidiomycota
- Class: Agaricomycetes
- Order: Agaricales
- Family: Agaricaceae
- Genus: Lepiota
- Species: L. atrodisca

Binomial name
- Lepiota atrodisca Zeller

Lepiota atrodisca Mycological characteristics
- Gills on hymenium
- Cap is ovate or flat
- Hymenium is free
- Stipe has a ring
- Spore print is white
- Edibility is unknown or poisonous

Lepiota atrodisca, commonly known as the dusky parasol, is a species of mushroom in the genus Lepiota. It is found in North America, South America, and India. Its edibility is unknown, but similar species are known to be deadly toxic.

== Taxonomy ==
Lepiota atrodisca was first described by Stanford Myron Zeller in 1938. DNA analysis has shown that L. atrodisca could actually be multiple species, only distinguishable through genetic sequencing.

== Description ==
The cap of Lepiota atrodisca is 1.5-5 centimeters in diameter, and has a dark-colored disc in the middle. The stipe is about 2–8.5 centimeters tall and 1-4 millimeters wide, and the gills are white.

== Habitat and ecology ==
Lepiota atrodisca grows in leaf litter in forests, and is common in low-lying areas in the Pacific Northwest. While it occasionally fruits during the summer and winter, it usually does so in the fall, shortly after it rains.
