= Lepiota cortinarius =

Scientific classification
- Kingdom: Fungi
- Division: Basidiomycota
- Class: Agaricomycetes
- Order: Agaricales
- Family: Agaricaceae
- Genus: Lepiota
- Species: L. cortinarius

Binomial name
- Lepiota cortinarius J.E.Lange, 1915

Species of fungus

Lepiota cortinarius is a species of fungus belonging to the family Agaricaceae.

It is native to Europe and Northern America.
