= Lepiota viridigleba =

Conservation status
- Data Deficient (IUCN 3.1)

- Critically Imperiled (NatureServe)

Scientific classification
- Kingdom: Fungi
- Division: Basidiomycota
- Class: Agaricomycetes
- Order: Agaricales
- Family: Agaricaceae
- Genus: Lepiota
- Species: L. viridigleba

Binomial name
- Lepiota viridigleba (Castellano) Z.W.Ge & M.E.Sm. (2013)

Synonyms
- Amogaster viridiglebus Castellano (1995)

Species of fungus

Lepiota viridigleba is a species of sequestrate fungus in the family Agaricaceae. It was first described as new to science by mycologist Michael Castellano in 1995, based on collections made among Populus roots in California. The fungus was initially called Amogaster viridiglebus and tentatively placed in the order Boletales. Molecular analysis revealed the fungus to be a member of the genus Lepiota, and it was transferred to that genus in 2013.

== See also ==
- List of Lepiota species
