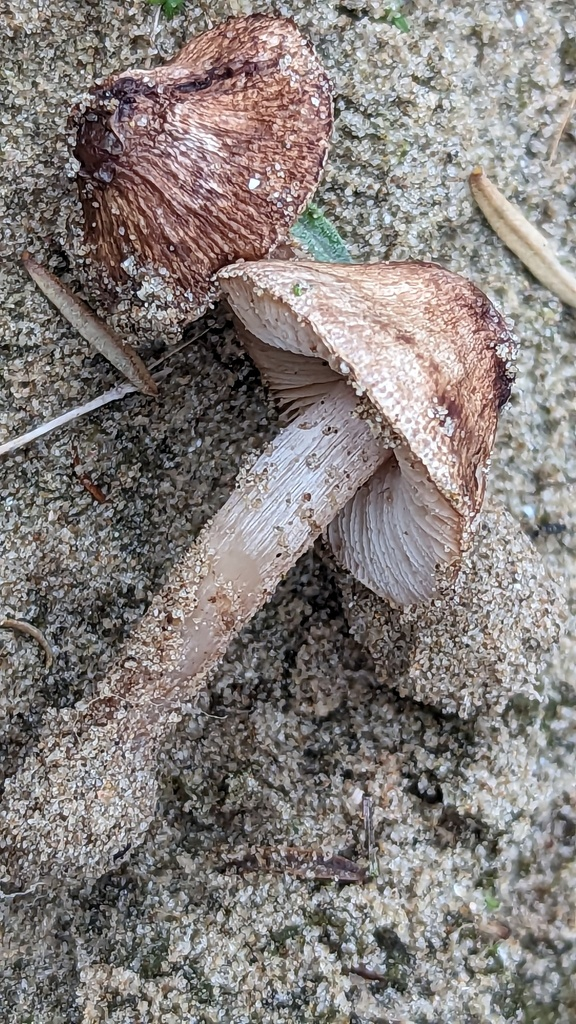

Conservation status
- Vulnerable (IUCN 3.1)

Scientific classification
- Kingdom: Fungi
- Division: Basidiomycota
- Class: Agaricomycetes
- Order: Agaricales
- Family: Nidulariaceae
- Genus: Lepiota
- Species: L. brunneolilacea

Binomial name
- Lepiota brunneolilacea Bon & Boiffard (1972)

= Lepiota brunneolilacea =

Species of fungus

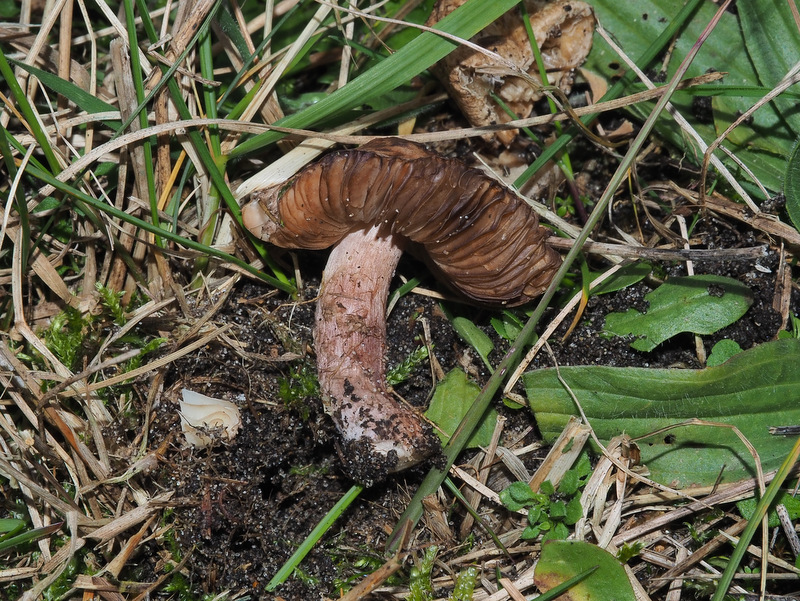
Lepiota brunneolilacea in the Netherlands

Lepiota brunneolilacea, also known as the star dapperling, is a gilled mushroom of the genus Lepiota in the order Agaricales. It is known to contain deadly amounts of alpha-Amanitin, and was responsible for a fatal poisoning.

== See also ==
- List of deadly fungi
- List of Lepiota species
