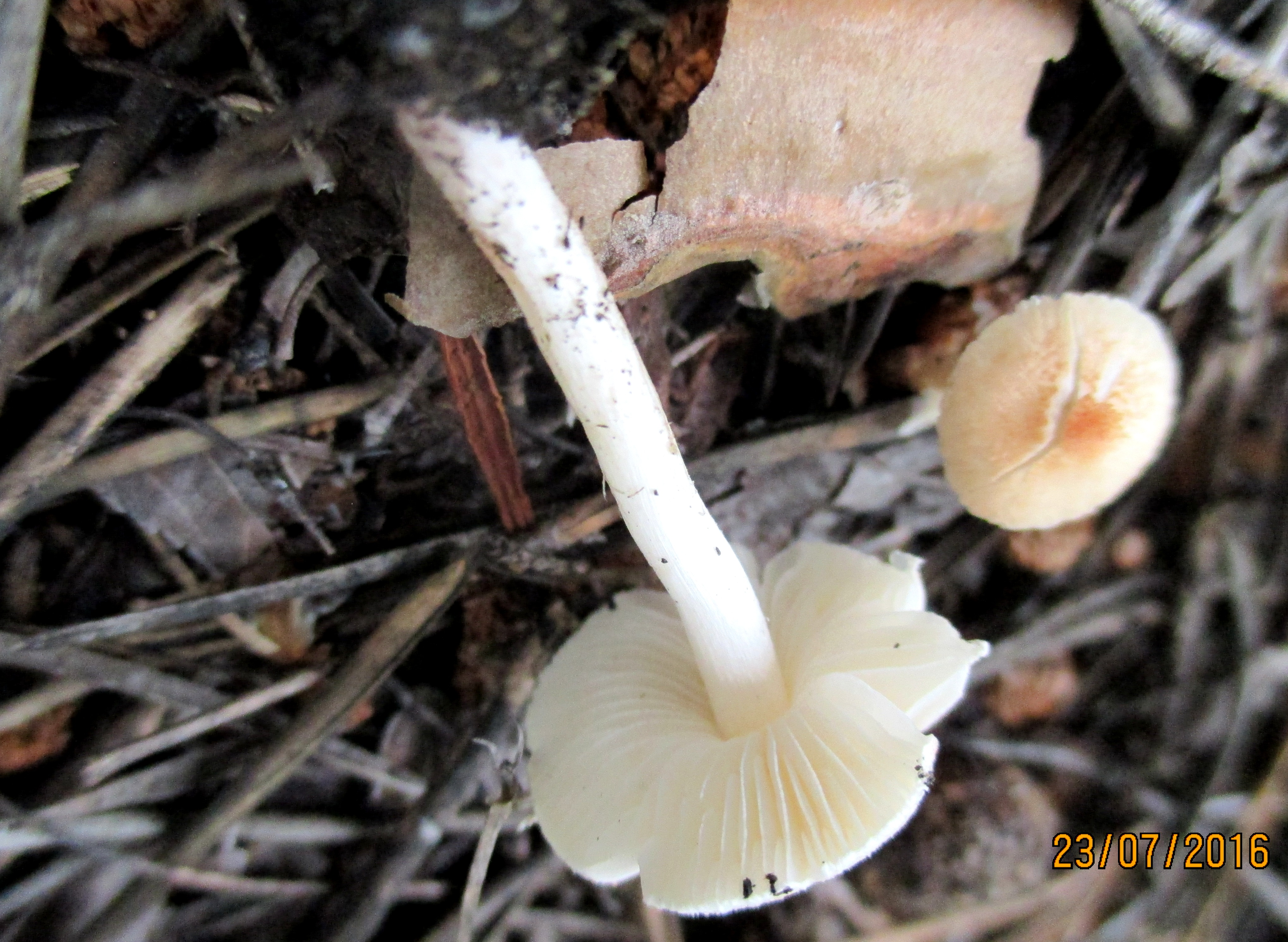

Scientific classification
- Domain: Eukaryota
- Kingdom: Fungi
- Division: Basidiomycota
- Class: Agaricomycetes
- Order: Agaricales
- Family: Agaricaceae
- Genus: Lepiota
- Species: L. subalba

Binomial name
- Lepiota subalba Kühner ex P.D.Orton

= Lepiota subalba =

Species of fungus

Lepiota subalba is a species of fungus belonging to the family Agaricaceae.

It is native to Europe.
