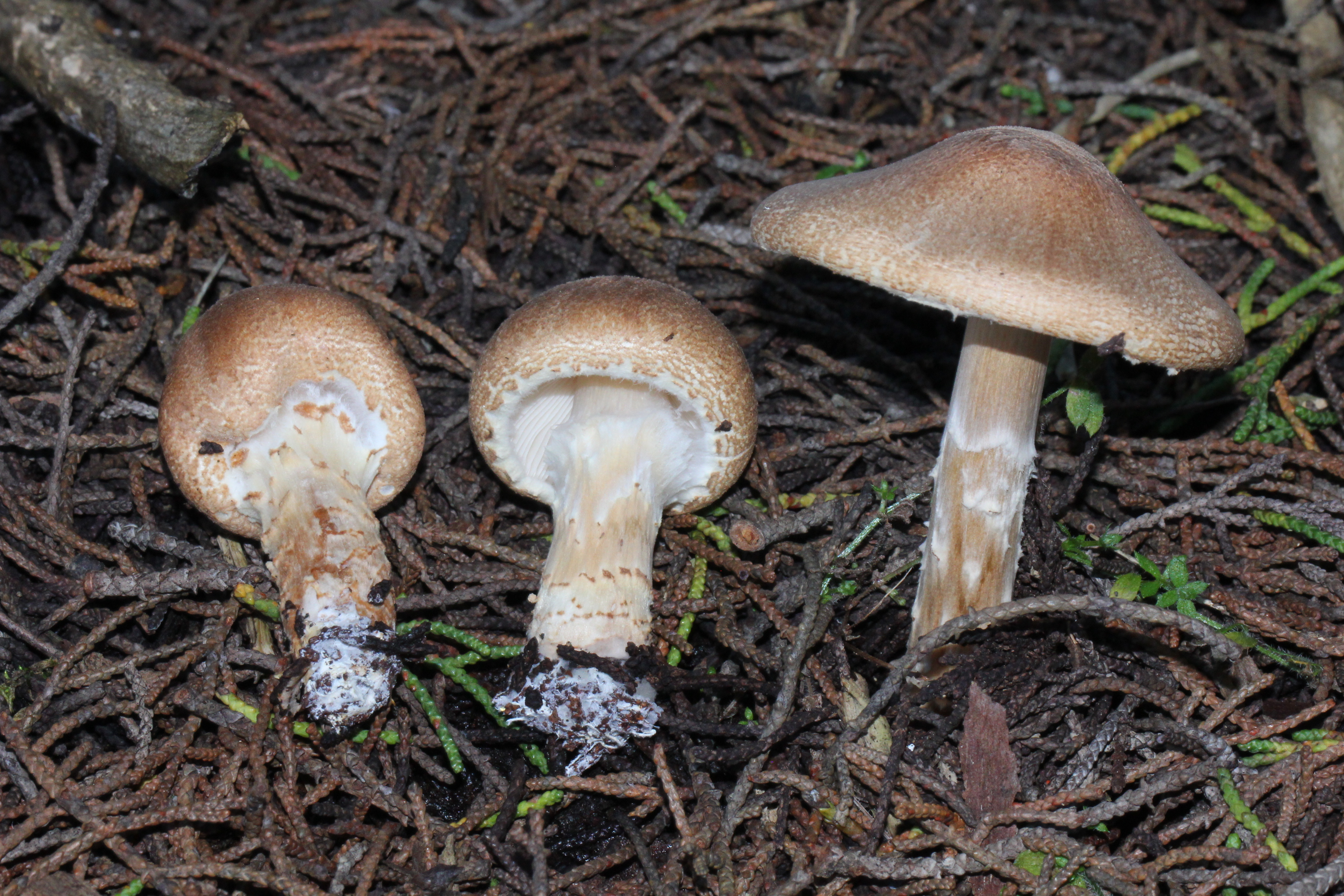

Scientific classification
- Domain: Eukaryota
- Kingdom: Fungi
- Division: Basidiomycota
- Class: Agaricomycetes
- Order: Agaricales
- Family: Agaricaceae
- Genus: Lepiota
- Species: L. spheniscispora

Binomial name
- Lepiota spheniscispora Vellinga (2001)

= Lepiota spheniscispora =

Species of fungus

Lepiota spheniscispora is a species of agaric fungus in the family Agaricaceae. Found in central coastal California, it was described in 2001 by mycologist Else Vellinga.

== See also ==
- List of Lepiota species
