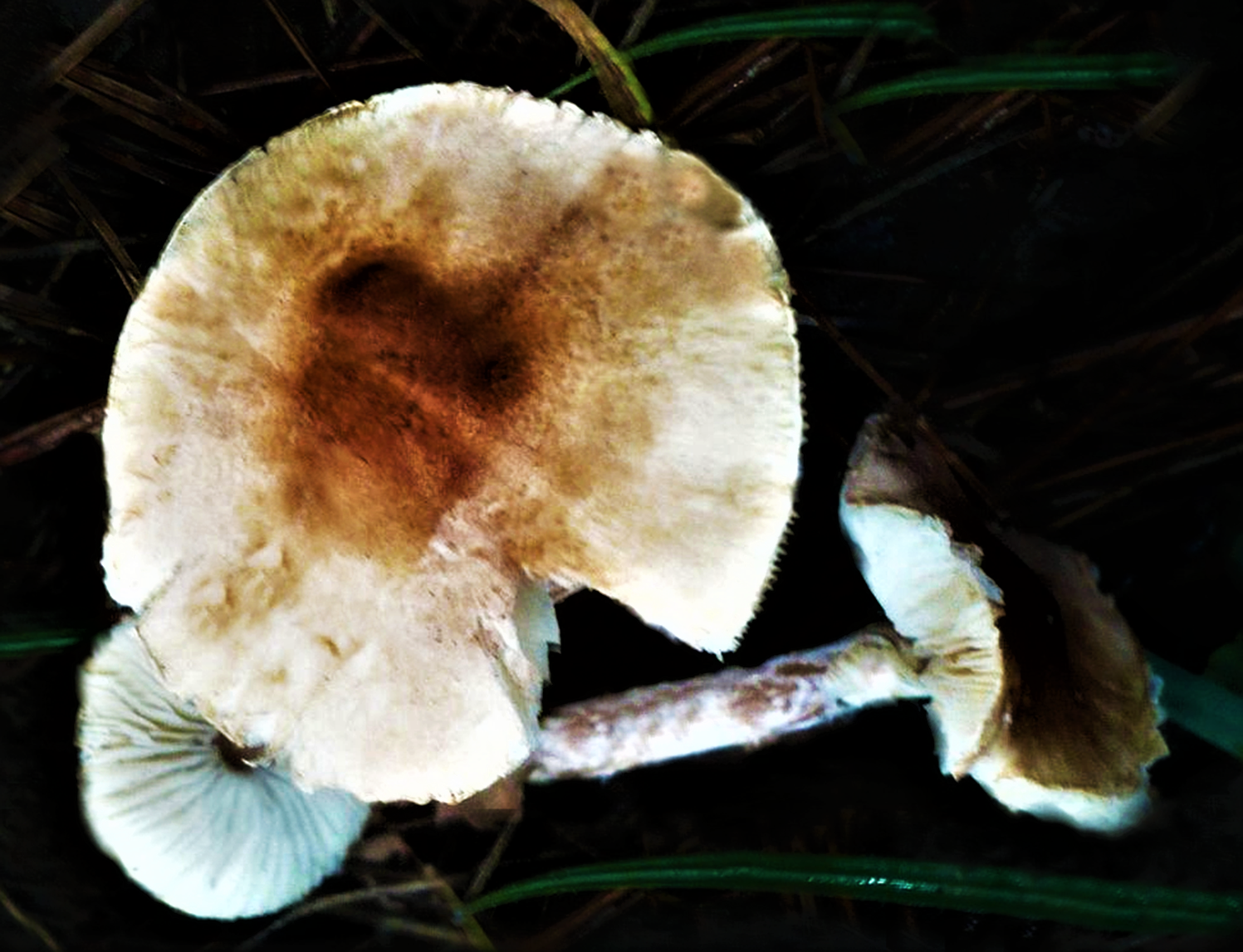

Scientific classification
- Domain: Eukaryota
- Kingdom: Fungi
- Division: Basidiomycota
- Class: Agaricomycetes
- Order: Agaricales
- Family: Agaricaceae
- Genus: Lepiota
- Species: L. helveola

Binomial name
- Lepiota helveola Bres.

= Lepiota helveola =

Species of fungus

Lepiota helveola Mycological characteristics
- Gills on hymenium
- Cap is convex or flat
- Hymenium is free
- Stipe has a ring
- Spore print is white
- Ecology is mycorrhizal
- Edibility is deadly

Lepiota helveola is a gilled mushroom of the genus Lepiota in the order Agaricales. It was described by Italian mycologist Giacomo Bresadola in 1882.

It has white gills and spores. They typically have rings on the stems,

Like several other species of the genus Lepiota, it contains amatoxins which may cause potentially fatal liver injury.

== Description ==
Cap 1.5–3 cm in diameter, convex to spreading, often with flattened disc, sometimes depressed, fibrillose, with fibrous scales at disc on whitish ground, fine concentric scales recurved around edges, moderate reddish brown, sometimes tinged pink to vinous, with a straight or wavy margin, sometimes raised with age. Blades free, set on a dark collarium on one or two thirds, white then creamy buff, tight, with finely fringed edges. Stem 2–4 x 0.3–0.7 mm, equal, stuffed then hollow, with bands of appressed, encrusted, brown fibrous scales on a white to pink-tinged ground, turning brown on crumpling, with a sometimes fleeting ring, similar to foot scales. Smell and flavor very sweet, fungal and slightly fragrant odor, sometimes indistinct, and fungal then metallic flavor.

== See also ==
- List of deadly fungi
- List of Lepiota species
