= Lepiota kuehneri =

Scientific classification
- Domain: Eukaryota
- Kingdom: Fungi
- Division: Basidiomycota
- Class: Agaricomycetes
- Order: Agaricales
- Family: Agaricaceae
- Genus: Lepiota
- Species: L. kuehneri

Binomial name
- Lepiota kuehneri Huijsman, 1943

Species of fungus

Lepiota kuehneri is a species of fungus belonging to the family Agaricaceae.
