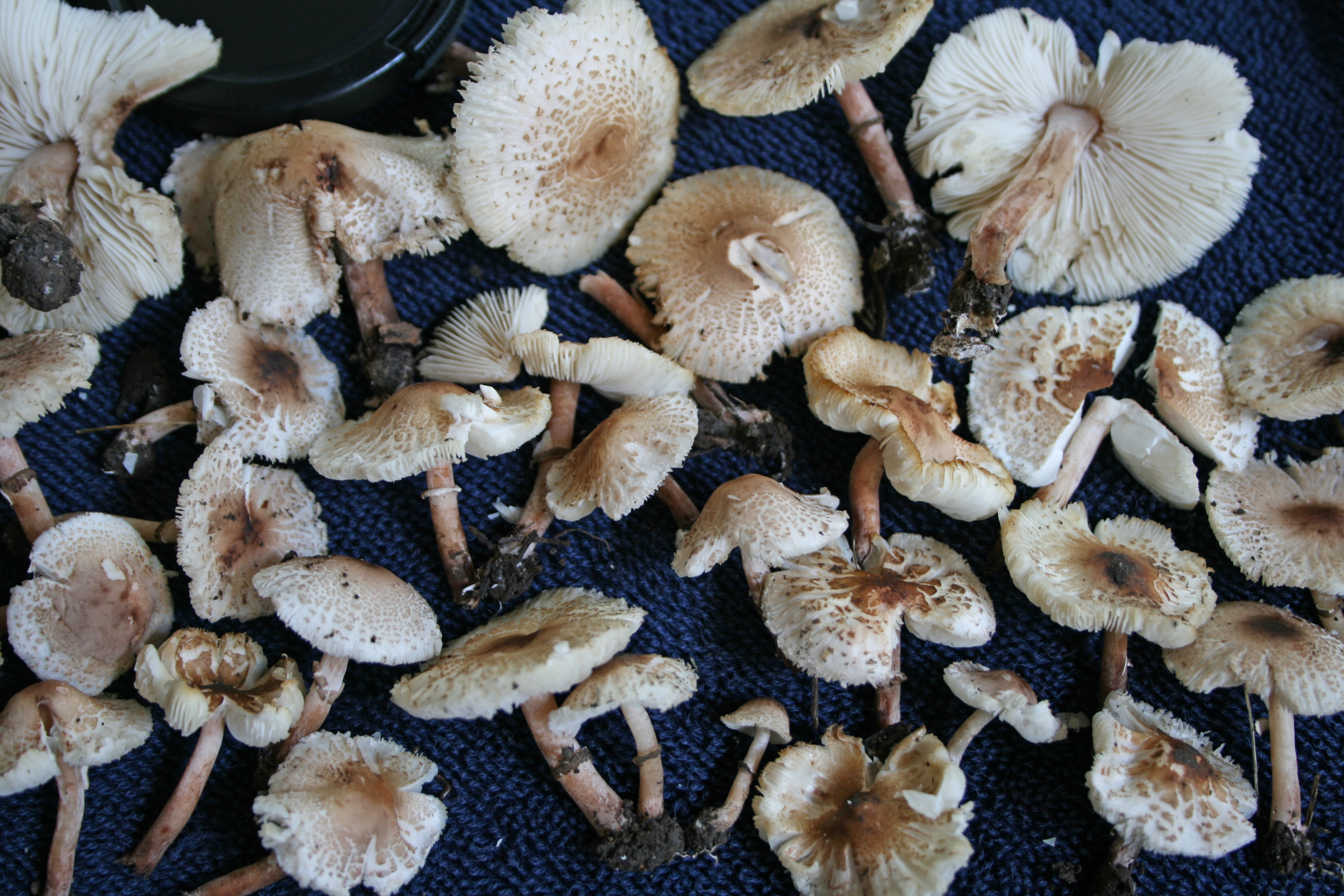

Scientific classification
- Domain: Eukaryota
- Kingdom: Fungi
- Division: Basidiomycota
- Class: Agaricomycetes
- Order: Agaricales
- Family: Agaricaceae
- Genus: Lepiota
- Species: L. lilacea

Binomial name
- Lepiota lilacea Bres.

= Lepiota lilacea =

Species of fungus

Lepiota lilacea Mycological characteristics
- Gills on hymenium
- Cap is convex
- Hymenium is free
- Stipe has a ring
- Ecology is saprotrophic
- Edibility is deadly

Lepiota lilacea is a species of fungus belonging to the family Agaricaceae. It was first described in Italy, in 1893, by Giacomo Bresadora, in his book Fungi Tridentini.

It is characterised by its small cap (up to 36 mm broad), with a dark purple disc, and its distinct annulus. Its spores do not turn reddish-brown under Melzer's reagent (are non-dextrinoid).

It is poisonous to humans.

It is native to Europe and America.
