= Noah Miller Glatfelter =

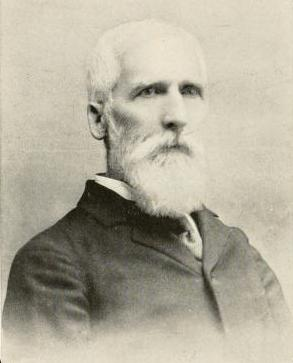
- Born: November 28, 1837; York County, Pennsylvania
- Died: April 2, 1911 (aged 73); St. Louis, Missouri
- Known for: Contributions to mycology and botany
- Scientific career
- Workplaces: Physician
- Author abbrev. (botany): Glatf.

Noah Miller Glatfelter (1837-1911) was an American physician, genealogist, and amateur botanist and mycologist who lived in St. Louis, Missouri, between 1867 and 1911. He served as a surgeon for the Union Army during the American Civil War, and was in private practice as a physician from the 1870s to 1907. In retirement his interests turned to botany and mycology; seven fungi have been named for him.

== Biography ==
Glatfelter was born November 28, 1837, in York County, Pennsylvania. He began his schooling in Millersville, Pennsylvania, and taught mathematics in Lebanon. He also took an early interest in the natural sciences, taking a course in geology, and organizing a display cabinet of rocks and minerals for his school. In 1862, he began his study of medicine under John Light Atlee, at the University of Pennsylvania. He received his M.D. from the University of Pennsylvania on March 12, 1864, and was appointed as a medical cadet on March 30, and immediately after became an assistant surgeon.

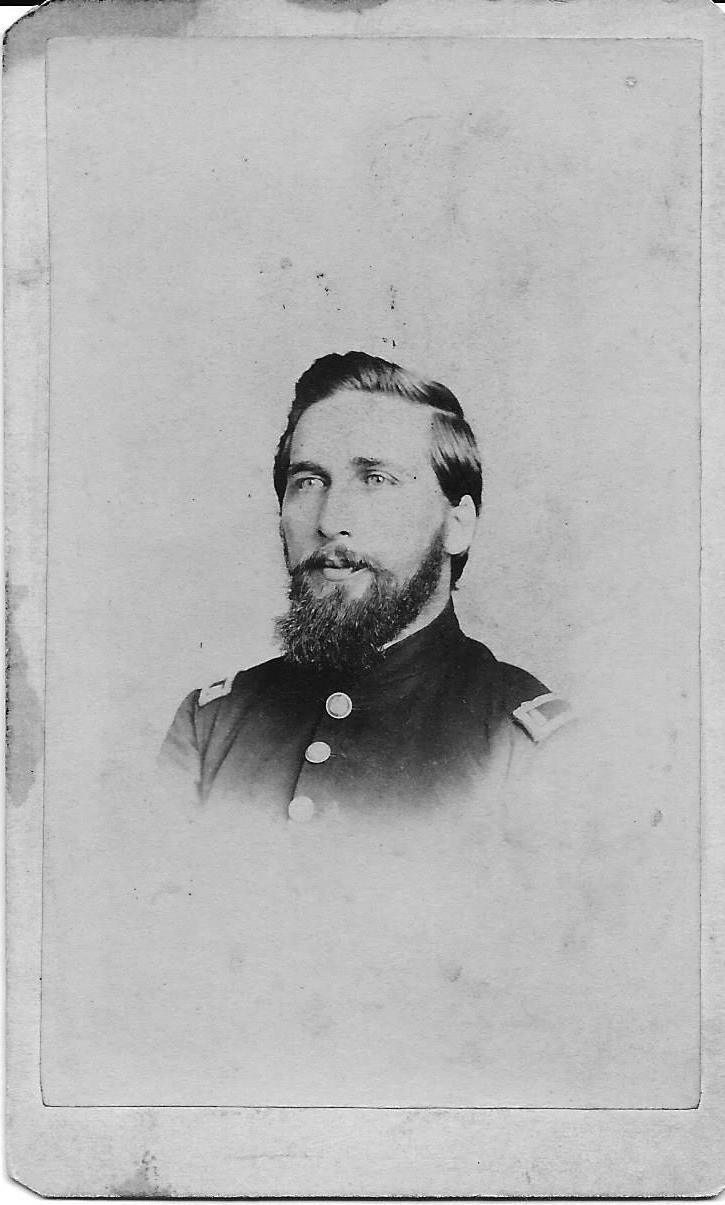
Assistant Surgeon Noah Miller Glatfelter, 1865

Glatfelter was present at the Second Battle of Fredericksburg, and was stationed at various hospitals in the area of Washington, D.C., including being in charge of a 375-foot vessel named New World that was converted into a hospital ship. The Depot Field Hospital of the Army of the Potomac was moved no less than four times in May and June 1864 while Glatfelter served with them. This was an incredible feat, as the hospital served up to 10,000 men.

Glatfelter married Mary Hegerty on March 23, 1865, and was then transferred to the Dakota Territory, where he stayed until he was mustered out in 1867, with the brevet rank of major. After he was mustered out, Noah and Mary moved to the St. Louis area, living first at 3705 North Broadway. In 1878 he owned a 25-acre farm located at the southeast corner of Gravois Road and Baptist Church road, which he later sold to Christian Graedeke, who had also worked at his farm at one time. He began his medical practice in the 1870s—his diploma was filed with the St. Louis County Court on September 17 of that year. His office was at 910 Salisbury Street, which is presently a parking lot north of Highway 70. They had seven children, Lisbeth M., Florence May, Edith Edna, Alice Maud Mary, Herbert Spencer, Grace Agnes, and Eva Ethel.

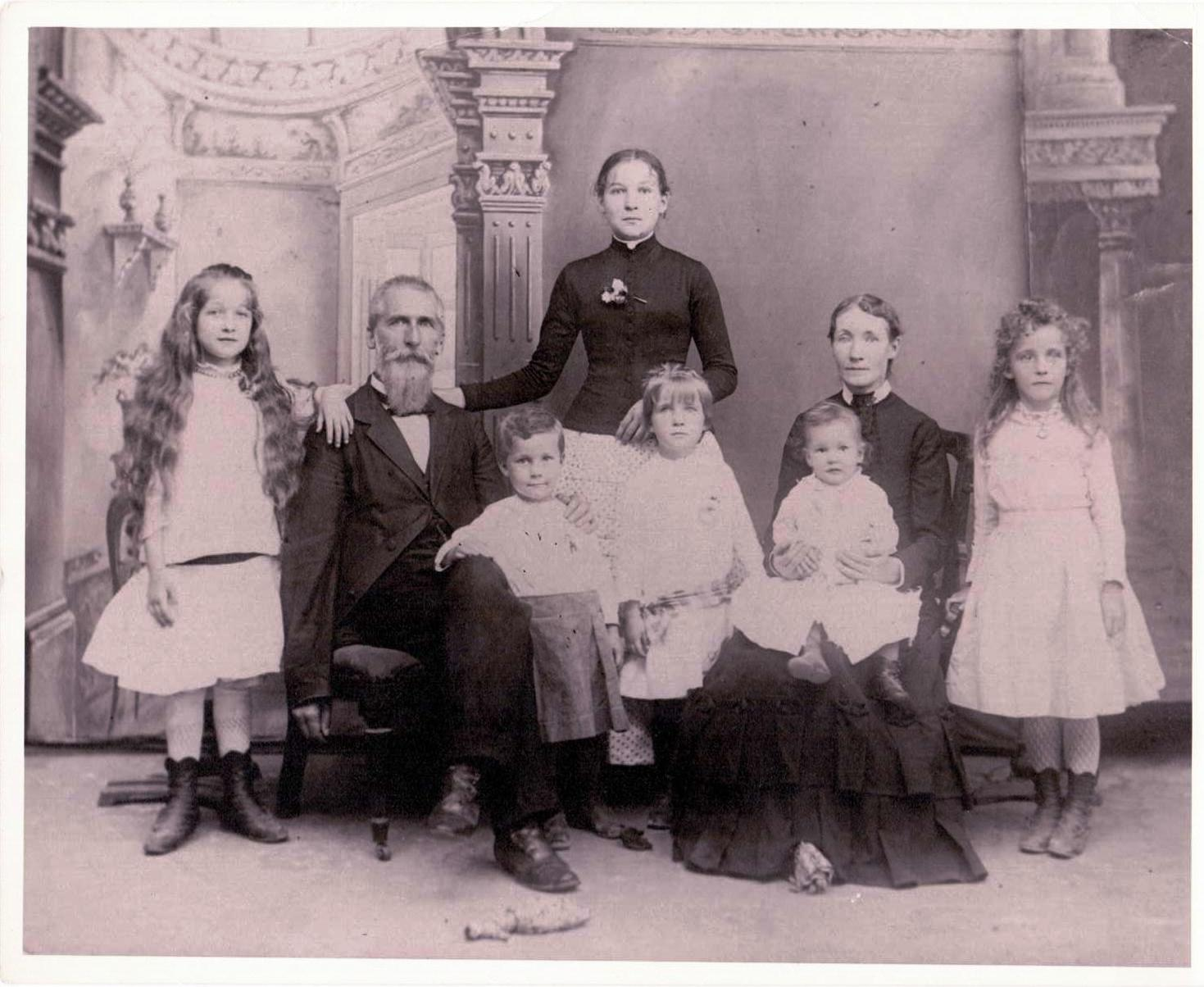
Noah Miller Glatfelter and family, about 1885. From left to right: Florence May, Noah, Herbert Spencer, Lisbeth, Alice, Grace, Mary, and Edith.

In 1882, Glatfelter had 4 houses built on north fourteenth street, and lived at 4620. In 1883, fourteenth street was renamed twentieth street and his address became 4720 N. 20th. He lived there for the rest of his life.

Glatfelter was a practicing physician until Mary's death in 1907, and occasionally did medical work for charity on behalf of the House of Bethany, as reflected in one of its journal entries:

(P. 33-34) "Yearly records of the House of Bethany continued from January 1st 1868 . . .Visited a sick soldier on 9th Street who lost his health while serving in the union army. His wife also was in poor health and their babe very sick and soon after died. During its illness they were cared for by the Sisters. Their rent was paid and food clothing and medical furnished. Dr. Parsons and afterwards Dr. Glatfelter gave their services free."

Glatfelter was a member of the Grand Army of the Republic Ransom Post # 131, which was founded by General William Tecumseh Sherman and was present at his funeral in 1891.

In the early 1890s he began his investigation of Salix (willow) species in the St. Louis area. His goal was to be able to classify willow by the venation on the leaves. He corresponded with botanists at Harvard, notably James Franklin Collins, Michael Shuck Bebb, Merritt Lyndon Fernald, Walter Deane and others. He has a willow hybrid named for him, Salix x glatfelteri.

In 1899, he was awarded the scientific medal, 2nd class, by the Academie Internationale de Geographie Botanique, for his work on willows.

In the late 1890s, his interests turned from botany to mycology, having gained interest in mushrooms through the membership of his daughter Lisbeth in the Boston Mycological Club, which was the first mushroom club organized in the United States. His primary correspondents were Curtis Gates Lloyd and Charles Horton Peck, and he met George F. Atkinson in 1903 at the St. Louis World's Fair. His collection of edible and poisonous mushrooms was part of the display of the Missouri Botanical Garden at the Fair. He passed on local accounts of mushroom poisonings to Peck. He compiled a list of over 500 species of St. Louis area mushrooms, which was published in 1906. His list of fungi was used as one of the sources for a checklist published by the Englemann Botanical Club in 1911.

There remain seven fungi named for him in the Index Fungorum, three of which are synonymous:

- Bolbitius glatfelteri Peck = Mycena glatfelteri (Peck) Murrill
- Collybia glatfelteri Murrill = Gymnopus glatfelteri (Murrill) Murrill
- Cortinellus glatfelteri Murrill = Tricholoma glatfelteri (Murrill) Murrill
- Lepiota glatfelteri

Glatfelter also became the family historian, publishing in 1901 The Record of Casper Glatfelter of Glattfelden, canton Zurich, Switzerland, immigrant, 1743, and of His Descendants, comprising 861 families, in two volumes, and a third book, Supplement to the Casper Glattfelder Record, Embracing the Addition of 545 Families, in 1910.

Glatfelter continued to collect specimens until 1911, in order to update his list for inclusion in the list of plants and fungi compiled by the Engelmann Botanical Club.

Glatfelter died on April 2, 1911, after a fall from a ladder, and is buried in Bellefontaine Cemetery in St. Louis with the rest of his family, with the exception of Herbert and Lisbeth.

== Autobiographical sketch from 1910 ==
"I, Noah Miller Glatfelter, was born Nov. 28 1837 in York Co. Pennsylvania. Now reside at 4720 No. 20th Street St. Louis Missouri. Son of Jonathan Glatfelter, farmer, and of Elizabeth Miller. Leaving Franklin and Marshall College sophomore year, read with Dr. John L. Atlee, Lancaster, Pa., entered the medical school of the University 1862, graduating 1864, then entered the army as assistant surgeon, U.S. volunteers. Mustered out Feb. 1867.

"Practiced my profession in and near St. Louis until about 4 years ago. Have paid some attention to Botany, especially to some researches on hybrid willow in the vicinity of Saint Louis, regarding which papers are published in journals devoted to Science. Of late years have been collecting the larger fungi about Saint Louis, a catalogue of which is published by the Academy of Science of Saint Louis of which I am a member.

"Was married to Miss Mary Hegarty at Phila. March 1865. Names of children Lisbeth, Florence May (d), Edith Edna, Alice Maud Mary, Grace Agnes (d), Eva Ethel (d), Herbert Spencer.

"Enjoy good health. Fall of 1858 had severe attack of acute inflammatory rheumatism, but since had no serious sickness of any kind -- having been laid up in bed but one day. 1899 saw YOUNG not 'Old Penn.'

== Publications ==
- (1894) "A Study of The Venation of the Species of Salix Described in Gray's Manual, With Reference to Their Determination", Missouri Botanical Garden Annual Report, Vol. 1894, pp. 46–60
- (1894) "A Study of the Relations of Salix nigra with S. amygdaloides and the Hybrids", Transactions of the St. Louis Academy of Science, Vol. VI, no. 13
- (1895) "Salix wardii Bebb, A review and Relation to S. Nigra and S. amygdaloides", "Science", New Series, Vol. 2, No. 44, pp. 582–584
- (1896) "Relations of Salix missourienses, Bebb to S. cordata, Muhl.", Proceedings of the St. Louis Academy of Science, vol. VII, no. 58
- (1896) "Salix cordata × sericea", Botanical Gazette, Vol. 22, no. 5 (Nov. 1896), pp. 392–400
- (1901) "Record of Casper Glattfelder of Glattfelden, Canton Zurich, Switzerland, immigrant, 1743: and of his descendants, in part, comprising 861 families", Nixon-Jones Printing Company, St. Louis (2 volumes)
- (1906) "A Preliminary list of higher fungi collected in the vicinity of St. Louis, Mo., from 1898 to 1905". Transactions of the Academy of Science of St. Louis, Vol. XVI, #4.
- (1910) "Supplement to the Casper Glattfelder Record, Embracing the Addition of 545 Families", Nixon-Jones Printing Company, St. Louis
- (1911) "A Preliminary Checklist of the Cryptogams and Phanerogams In The Vicinity of Saint Louis, Missouri," published by the Engelmann Botanical Club. (post-mortem)
