= Sterigma =

Structure in some species of fungi

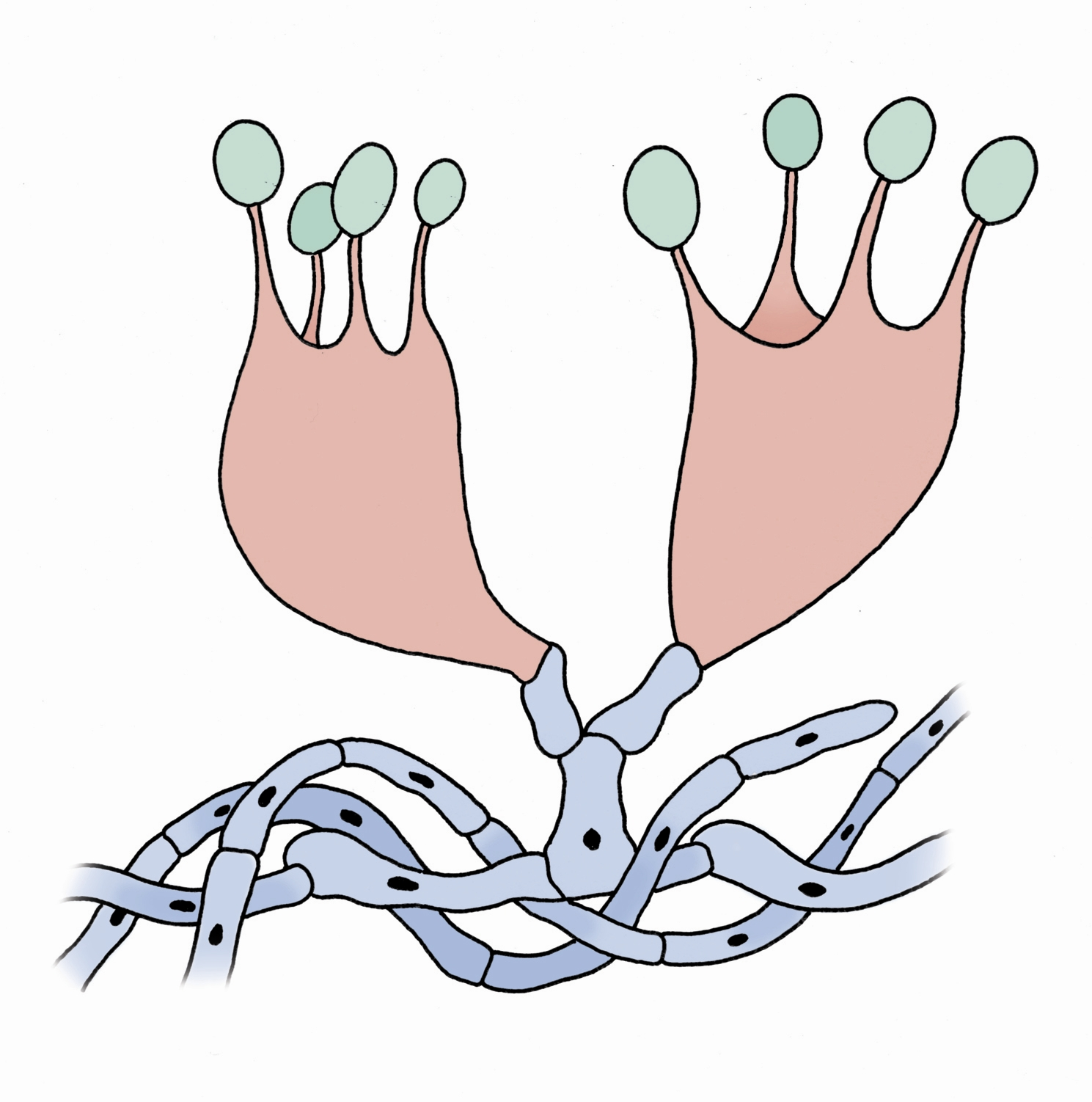
The sterigmata are the slender extensions that connect the spores (green) to the basidia (red).

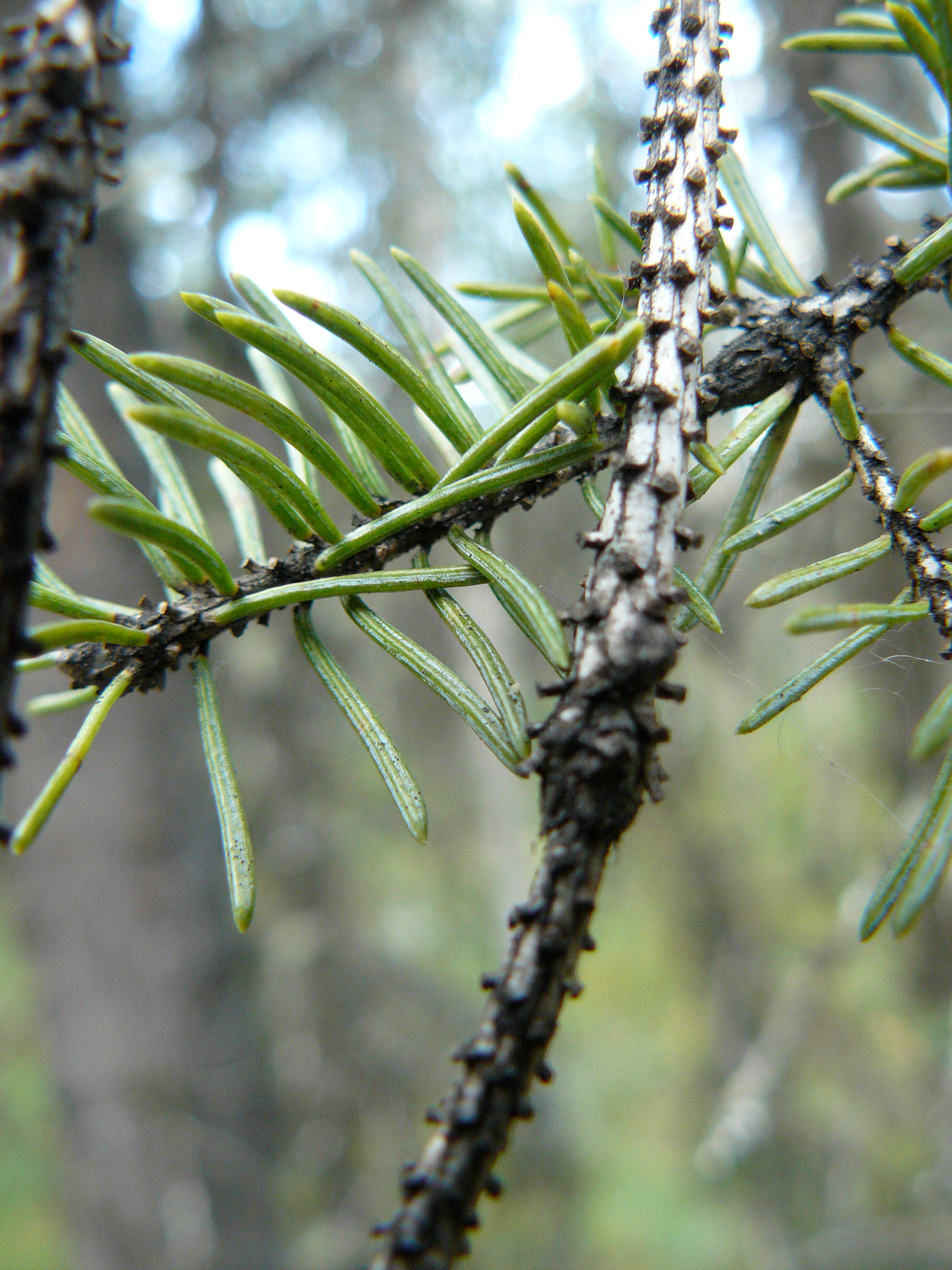
The sterigmata remain as small projections on twigs of Picea and Tsuga after the leaves have fallen.

In biology, a sterigma (pl.: sterigmata) is a small supporting structure.

It commonly refers to an extension of the basidium (the spore-bearing cells) consisting of a basal filamentous part and a slender projection which carries a spore at the tip. The sterigmata are formed on the basidium as it develops and undergoes meiosis, to result in the production of (typically) four nuclei. The nuclei gradually migrate to the tips of the basidium, and one nucleus will migrate into each spore that develops at the tip of each sterigma.

In less common usage, a sterigma is a structure within the posterior end of the genitalia of female Lepidoptera.

It also refers to the stem-like structure, also called a "woody peg" at the base of the leaves of some, but not all conifers, specifically Picea and Tsuga.
