= Mycotaxon =

Mycotaxon was a peer-reviewed scientific journal that covers the nomenclature and taxonomy of fungi, including lichens. The journal was founded by Grégoire L. Hennebert and Richard P. Korf in 1974. They were frustrated that papers submitted to journals such as Mycologia took a year or longer from submission to publication. Korf and Hennebert introduced a number of innovations to make their journal more efficient and accessible than its contemporaries. Mycotaxon reduced the wait time between submission and publication by requiring authors to submit camera-ready copy. Linotype was the industry standard at the time; Mycotaxon used photo-offset lithography to expedite publication. A quarterly journal, Mycotaxon aimed to publish papers within four months of submission.

Mycotaxon took an unusual non-blind approach to refereeing: authors were required to enlist a reviewer outside their institution to peer-review their manuscript prior to its submission. Initially Mycotaxon did not demand page charges from authors, rather relying on subscription fees to finance publication. Papers of all lengths were accepted. The journal published its last issue (volume 137, issue 4) on November 11, 2023.

As of 2025, the journal has made all of its content Open Access - all the articles published in the journal are now searchable via the Biodiversity Heritage Library.

== See also ==
- Persoonia – a journal with similar scope
