= List of Gymnopus species =

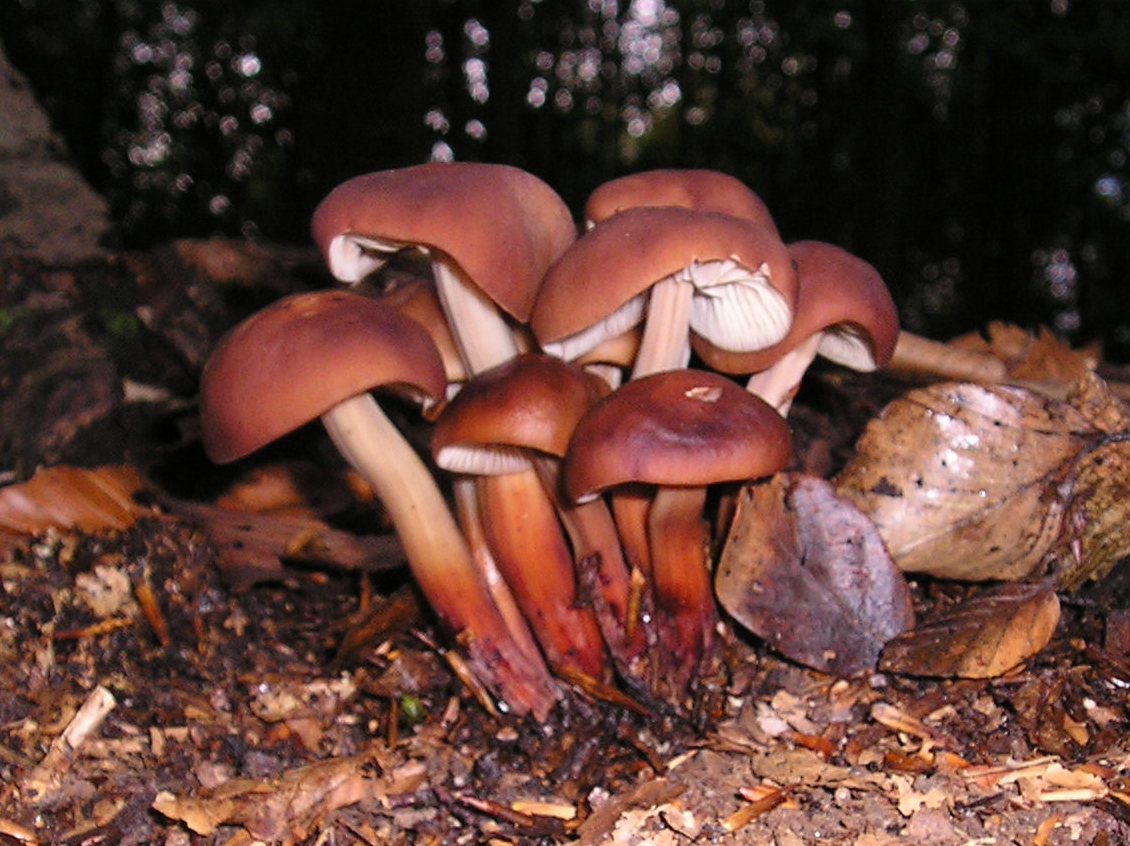
Gymnopus fusipes is the type species of the genus Gymnopus.

This is a list of species in the agaric genus Gymnopus. The following species are recognised in the genus Gymnopus:

A B C D E F G H I J K L M N O P Q R S T U V U W X Y Z

== A ==
- Gymnopus agricola Murrill (1916)
- Gymnopus albipes Har. Takah. & Taneyama (2016)
- Gymnopus albistrictus Murrill (1938)
- Gymnopus alcalinolens (Peck) Murrill (1916)
- Gymnopus alkalivirens (Singer) Halling (1997)
- Gymnopus allegreti (De Seynes) A.W. Wilson, Desjardin & E. Horak (2004)
- Gymnopus alliifoetidissimus T.H. Li & J.P. Li (2020)
- Gymnopus alpicola (Bon & Ballarà) Esteve-Rav., V. González, Arenal & E. Horak (1998)
- Gymnopus alpinus (Vilgalys & O.K. Mill.) Antonín & Noordel. (1997)
- Gymnopus amygdalisporus Polemis & Noordel. (2007)
- Gymnopus androsaceus (L.) Della Magg. & Trassin. (2014)
- Gymnopus aporpohyphes (Singer) Tkalčec & Mešić (2013)
- Gymnopus aquosus (Bull.) Antonín & Noordel. (1997)
- Gymnopus atlanticus V. Coimbra, Pinheiro, Wartchow & Gibertoni (2015)
- Gymnopus atratoides (Peck) Murrill (1916)
- Gymnopus aurantiacus Murrill (1939)
- Gymnopus aurantiipes (Corner) A.W. Wilson, Desjardin & E. Horak (2004)
- Gymnopus austrosemihirtipes A.W. Wilson, Desjardin & E. Horak (2004)
- Gymnopus avellaneidiscus Murrill (1916)
- Gymnopus avellaneigriseus Murrill (1916)

== B ==
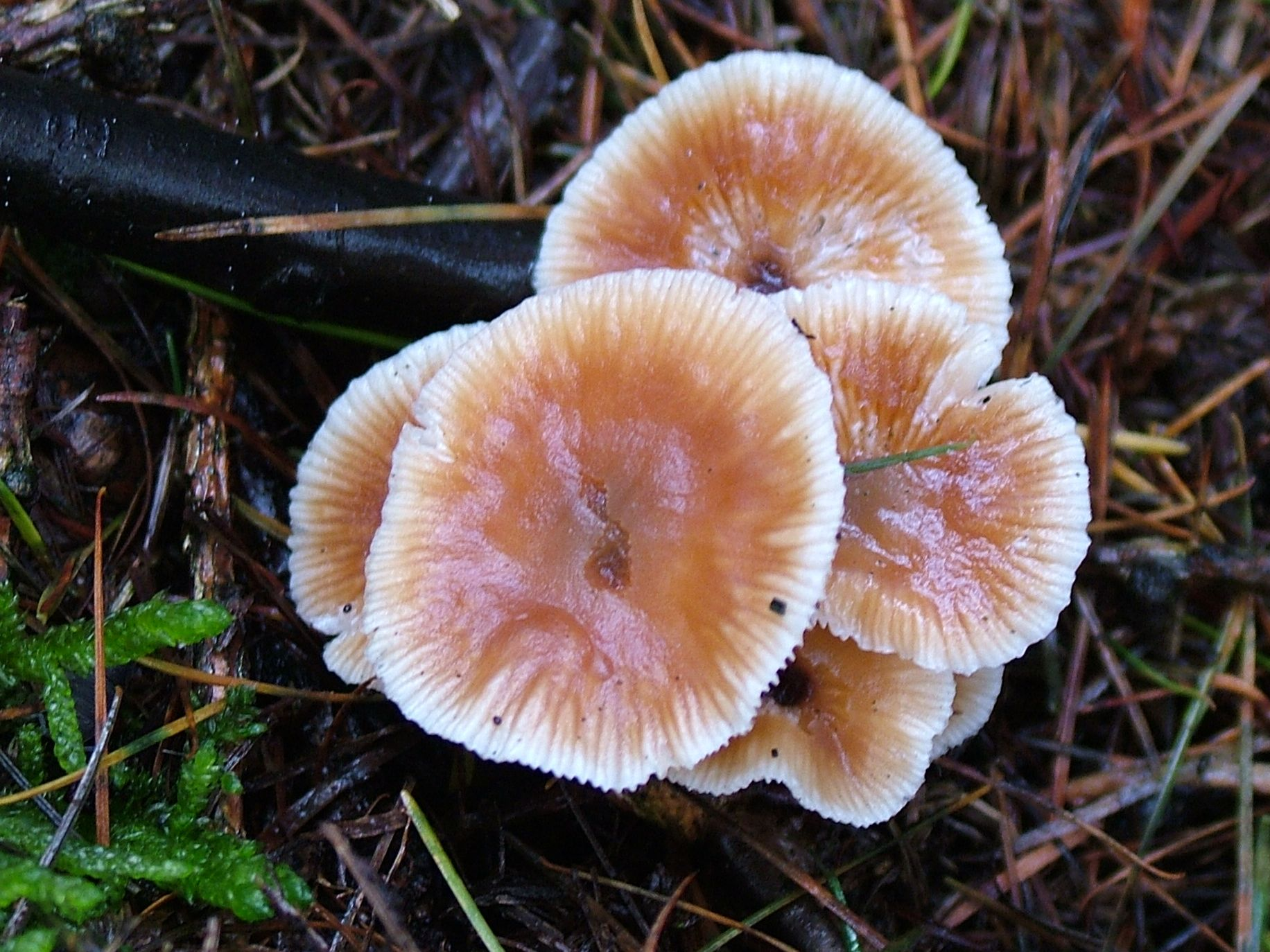
Gymnopus brassicolens

- Gymnopus bactrosporus (Singer) Mešić & Tkalčec (2013)
- Gymnopus barbipes R.H.Petersen & K.W.Hughes (2014) – North America
- Gymnopus beltraniae Bañares, Antonín & G. Moreno (2007)
- Gymnopus benoistii (Boud.) Antonín & Noordel. (1997)
- Gymnopus bicolor A.W. Wilson, Desjardin & E. Horak (2004)
- Gymnopus billbowesii Desjardin & B.A. Perry (2017)
- Gymnopus bisporiger Antonín & Noordel. (2008)
- Gymnopus bisporus (J. Carbó & Pérez-De-Greg.) J. Carbó & Pérez-De-Greg. (2006)
- Gymnopus brassicolens (Romagn.) Antonín & Noordel. (1997)
- Gymnopus brevistipitatus (Antonín) Tkalčec & Mešić (2013)
- Gymnopus brunneiniger César, Bandala & Montoya (2020)
- Gymnopus brunneodiscus Antonín, Ryoo & Ka (2020)
- Gymnopus brunnescens (Murrill) M. Villarreal, Heykoop & Esteve-Rav. (2002)
- Gymnopus bulliformis R.H. Petersen (2016)

== C ==
- Gymnopus campinaranae (Singer) Mešić & Tkalčec (2013)
- Gymnopus carnosus (Curtis) Murrill (1916)
- Gymnopus caryophilus Murrill (1945)
- Gymnopus castaneus M. Villarreal, Heykoop & Esteve-Rav. (2002)
- Gymnopus catalonicus (Vila & Llimona) Vila & Llimona (2006)
- Gymnopus ceraceicola J.A. Cooper & P. Leonard (2013)
- Gymnopus cervinicolor (Murrill) J.L. Mata (2009)
- Gymnopus cervinus (Henn.) Desjardin & B.A. Perry (2017)
- Gymnopus cinchonensis Murrill (1916)
- Gymnopus cockaynei (G. Stev.) J.A. Cooper & P. Leonard (2012)
- Gymnopus coniceps Murrill (1942)
- Gymnopus contrarius (Peck) Halling (1997)
- Gymnopus coracicolor (Berk. & M.A. Curtis) J.L. Mata (2009)
- Gymnopus cremeimellus Murrill (1916)
- Gymnopus cremeostipitatus Antonín, R.Ryoo & K.H.Ka (2014) – Korea
- Gymnopus cremoraceus (Peck) Murrill (1916)

== D ==
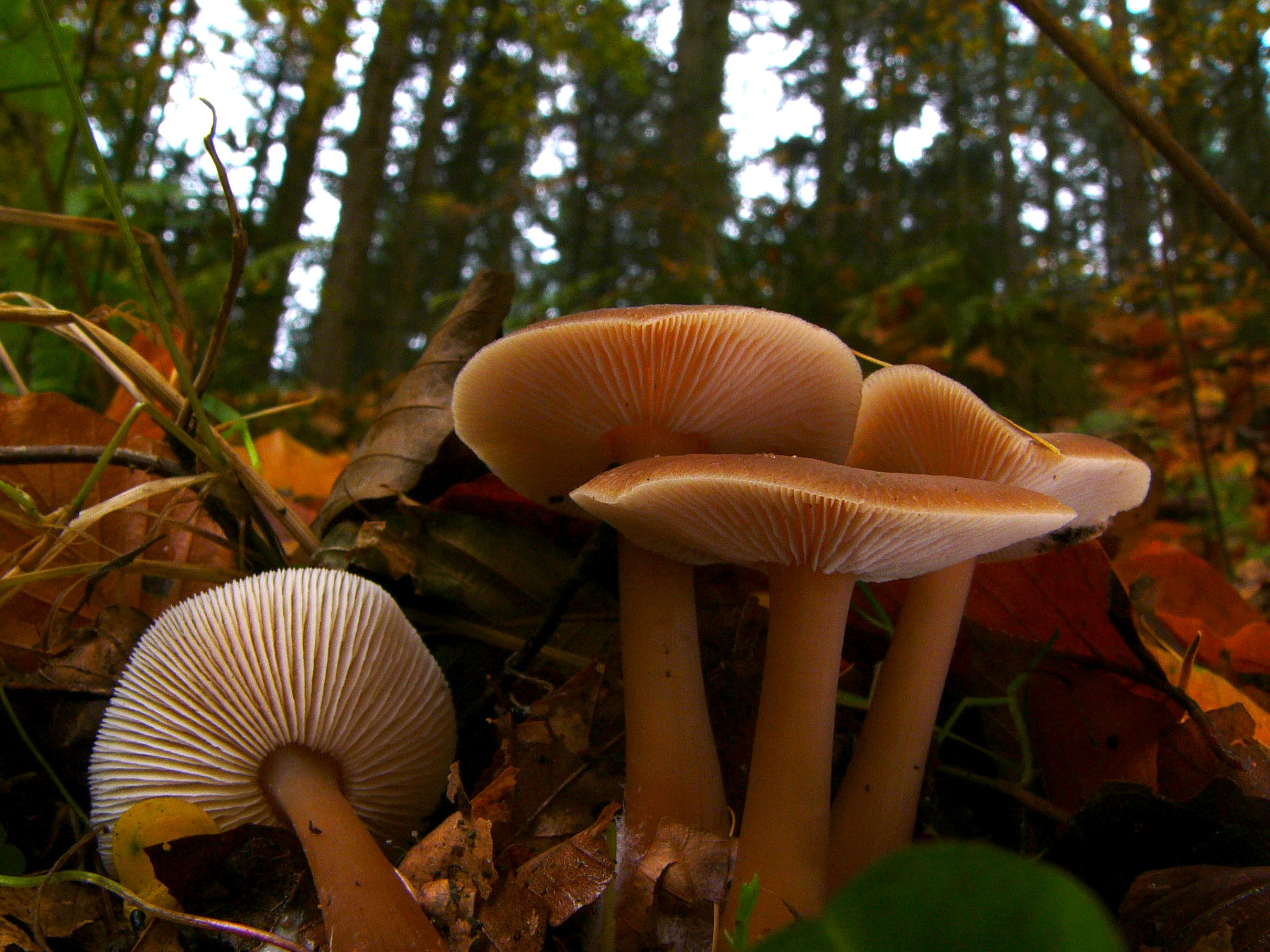
Gymnopus dryophilus

- Gymnopus densilamellatus Antonín, Ryoo & Ka (2016)
- Gymnopus dentatus Murrill (1916)
- Gymnopus denticulatus Murrill (1916)
- Gymnopus detersibilis (Berk. & M.A. Curtis) Murrill (1916)
- Gymnopus discipes (Clem.) Murrill (1916)
- Gymnopus dispermus E. Ludw. (2012) Murrill (1916)
- Gymnopus domesticus Murrill (1916)
- Gymnopus druceae (G. Stev.) J.A. Cooper & P. Leonard (2012)
- Gymnopus dryophiloides Antonín, Ryoo & Ka (2020)
- Gymnopus dryophilus (Bull.) Murrill (1916)
- Gymnopus dysodes (Halling) Halling (1997)
- Gymnopus dysosmus Polemis & Noordel. (2007)

== E ==
- Gymnopus earleae Murrill (1916)
- Gymnopus eatonae Murrill (1916)
- Gymnopus ellisii Murrill 1917
- Gymnopus erythropus (Pers.) Antonín, Halling & Noordel. (1997)
- Gymnopus expallens (Peck) Murrill (1916)
- Gymnopus exsculptus (Fr.) Murrill 1916

== F ==
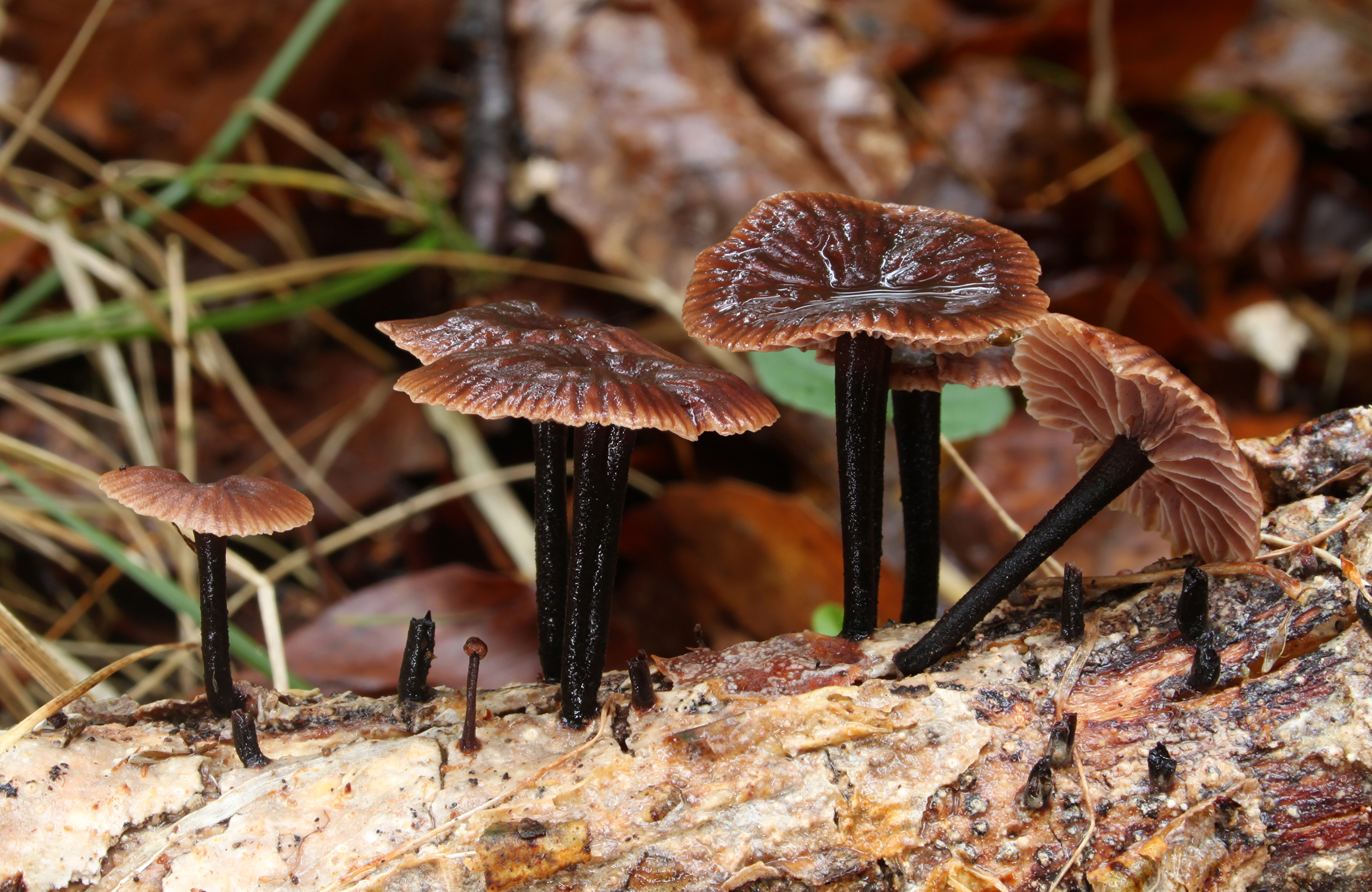
Gymnopus foetidus

- Gymnopus fagiphilus (Velen.) Antonín, Halling & Noordel. (1997)
- Gymnopus farinaceus Murrill (1916)
- Gymnopus fasciatus (Penn.) Halling (1997)
- Gymnopus flavescens Murrill (1916)
- Gymnopus floridanus Murrill (1939)
- Gymnopus foetidus (Sowerby) P.M. Kirk (2014)
- Gymnopus fragillior R.H. Petersen (2016)
- Gymnopus fuegianus (Singer) Halling & J.L. Mata (2004)
- Gymnopus fuliginellus (Peck) Murrill (1916)
- Gymnopus fulvidiscus Murrill (1916)
- Gymnopus fuscolilacinus (Peck) Murrill (1916)
- Gymnopus fuscopurpureus (Pers.) Antonín, Halling & Noordel. (1997)
- Gymnopus fusipes (Bull.) Gray (1821)

== G ==
- Gymnopus gelatinosipes (Desjardin & E. Horak) J.A. Cooper (2023)
- Gymnopus glabrosipes R.H. Petersen (2016)
- Gymnopus glatfelteri Murrill (1916)
- Gymnopus griseifolius Murrill (1916)

== H ==
- Gymnopus hakaroa J.A. Cooper & P. Leonard (2013)
- Gymnopus hariolorum J.A. Cooper & P. Leonard (2013)
- Gymnopus hariolorum (Bull.) Antonín, Halling & Noordel. (1997)
- Gymnopus herinkii Antonín & Noordel. (1996)
- Gymnopus hirtelloides Antonín & Noordel. (1996)
- Gymnopus hirtellus (Berk. & Broome) Desjardin & B.A. Perry (2017)
- Gymnopus hondurensis (Murrill) J.L. Mata (2003)
- Gymnopus huijsmanii Antonín & Noordel. (1997)
- Gymnopus hybridus (Kühner & Romagn.) Antonín & Noordel. (1997)

== I ==
- Gymnopus imbricatus J.A. Cooper & P. Leonard (2013)
- Gymnopus impudicus (Fr.) Antonín, Halling & Noordel. (1997)
- Gymnopus indoctoides A.W. Wilson, Desjardin & E. Horak (2004)
- Gymnopus inexpectatus Consiglio, Vizzini, Antonín & Contu (2008)
- Gymnopus inodorus (Pat.) Antonín & Noordel. (1997)
- Gymnopus inusitatus (Vila & Llimona) Vila & Llimona (2006)
- Gymnopus iocephalus (Berk. & M.A. Curtis) Halling (1997)
- Gymnopus irresolutus Desjardin & B.A. Perry (2017)

== J ==
- Gymnopus jamaicensis Murrill (1916)
- Gymnopus johnstonii (Murrill) A.W. Wilson, Desjardin & E. Horak (2004)
- Gymnopus junquilleus R.H. Petersen & J.L. Mata (2006)

== K ==
- Gymnopus kanukaneus (G. Stev.) J.A. Cooper (2023)
- Gymnopus kauffmanii (Halling) Halling (1997)
- Gymnopus kidsoniae (G. Stev.) J.A. Cooper & P. Leonard (2012)

== L ==
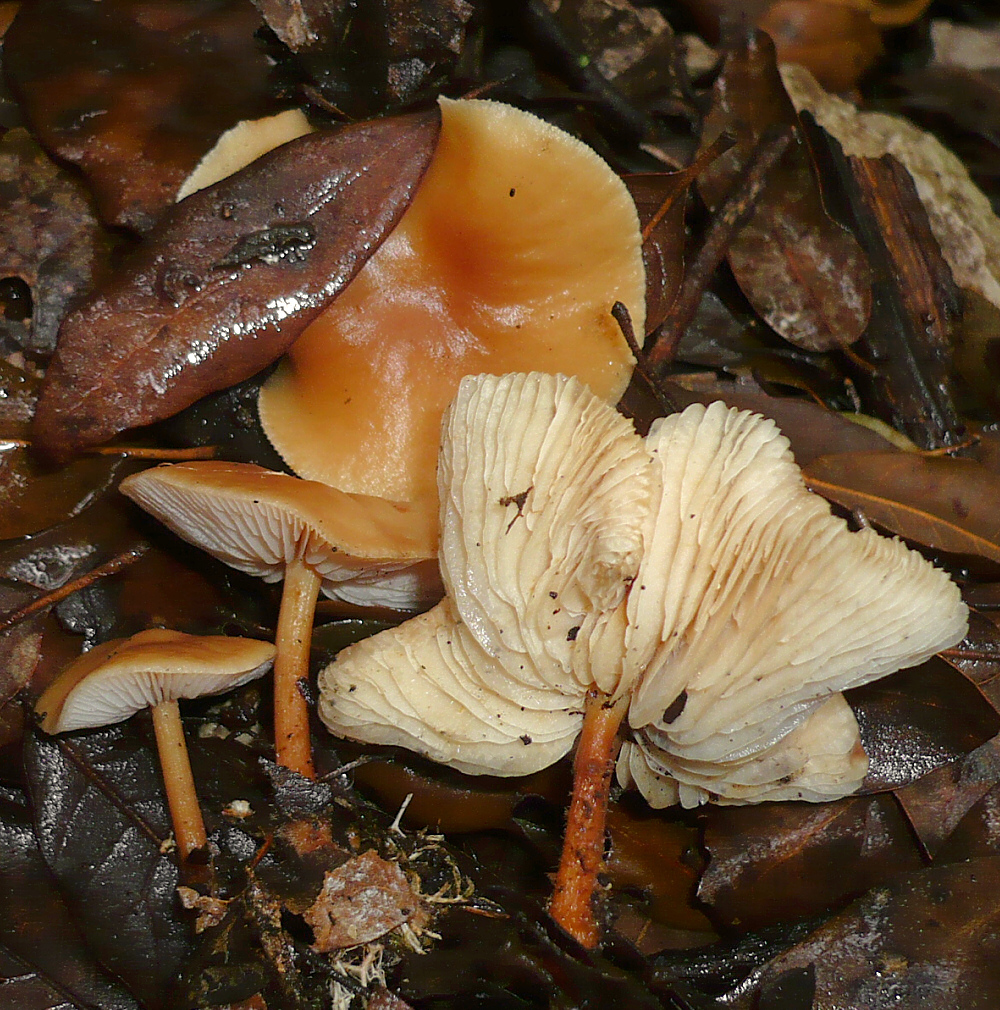
Gymnopus lanipes

- Gymnopus lachnophyllus (Berk.) Murrill (1916)
- Gymnopus lanipes (Malençon & Bertault) Vila & Llimona (2006)
- Gymnopus lodgeae (Singer) J.L. Mata (2003)
- Gymnopus loiseleurietorum (M.M. Moser, Gerhold & Tobies) Antonín & Noordel. (1997)

== M ==
- Gymnopus macropus Halling (1996)
- Gymnopus mammillatus Murrill (1939)
- Gymnopus microspermus (Peck) Murrill (1916)
- Gymnopus microsporus (Peck) Murrill (1916)
- Gymnopus montagnei (Berk.) Redhead (2014)
- Gymnopus monticola Murrill (1916)
- Gymnopus moseri Antonín & Noordel. (1997)
- Gymnopus mucubajiensis (Dennis) Halling (1996)
- Gymnopus musicola Murrill (1916)
- Gymnopus mustachius Desjardin & B.A. Perry (2017)

== N ==
- Gymnopus neobrevipes R.H. Petersen (2019)
- Gymnopus nigrescens Bañares, G. Moreno, P. Alvarado & Antonín (2021)
- Gymnopus nigritiformis Murrill (1916)
- Gymnopus nigroimplicatus (Corner) Mešić, Tkalčec & Chun Y. Deng (2013)
- Gymnopus nubicola Halling (1996)

== O ==
- Gymnopus ocellus Desjardin & B.A. Perry (2017)
- Gymnopus ocior (Pers.) Antonín & Noordel. (1997)
- Gymnopus oculatus Murrill (1916)
- Gymnopus omphalina Murrill (1945)
- Gymnopus omphalodes (Berk.) Halling & J.L. Mata (2004)
- Gymnopus oncospermatis (Corner) Har. Takah. (2002)
- Gymnopus oreadoides (Pass.) Antonín & Noordel. (1997)
- Gymnopus orizabensis Murrill (1916)
- Gymnopus otagensis (G. Stev.) J.A. Cooper (2023)

== P ==
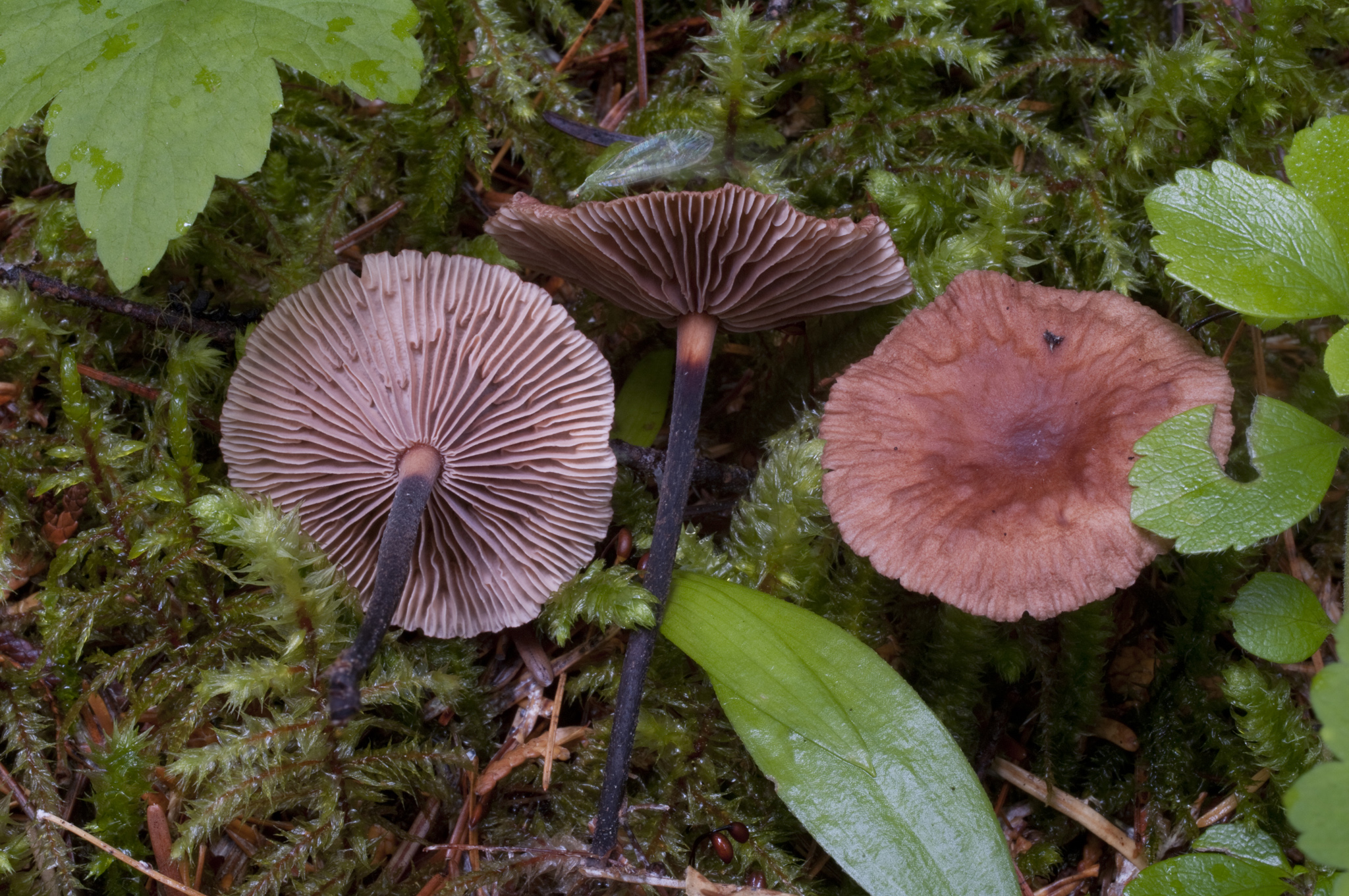
Gymnopus perforans

- Gymnopus pacificus (Singer) Tkalčec & Mešić (2013)
- Gymnopus pallidus Murrill (1916)
- Gymnopus pallipes J.P. Li & Chun Y. Deng (2021)
- Gymnopus phyllogenus Har. Takah., Taneyama & Terashima (2016)
- Gymnopus physcopodius (Mont.) Murrill (1916)
- Gymnopus piceipes T. Miyam. & Igarashi (2001)
- Gymnopus pilularius (Mont.) Murrill (1916)
- Gymnopus pleurocystidiatus Desjardin & B.A. Perry (2017)
- Gymnopus polyphyllus (Peck) Halling (1997)
- Gymnopus portoricensis R.H. Petersen (2019)
- Gymnopus potassiovirescens (Contu) Antonín & Noordel. (2008)
- Gymnopus pseudolodgeae J.L. Mata (2004)
- Gymnopus pubipes Antonín, A. Ortega & Esteve-Rav. (2003)
- Gymnopus purpureicollus (Corner) A.W. Wilson, Desjardin & E. Horak (2004)
- Gymnopus putillus (Fr.) Antonín, Halling & Noordel. (1997)
- Gymnopus pygmaeus V. Coimbra, E. Larss., Wartchow & Gibertoni (2016)
- Gymnopus pyracanthoides R.H. Petersen (2016)
- Gymnopus pyrenaeicus (Bon & Ballarà) Antonín & Noordel. (2008)

== Q ==
- Gymnopus quinaultii R.H. Petersen (2016)

== R ==
- Gymnopus ramulicola T.H. Li & S.F. Deng (2016)
- Gymnopus reginae E. Ludw. (2012)
- Gymnopus rhizomorphicola (Antonín) Mešić & Tkalčec (2013)
- Gymnopus rigidichordus (Petch) Tkalčec & Mešić (2013)
- Gymnopus roseilividus Murrill (1916)

== S ==
- Gymnopus semihirtipes (Peck) Halling (1997)
- Gymnopus sepiiconicus (Corner) A.W. Wilson, Desjardin & E. Horak (2004)
- Gymnopus similis Antonín, Ryoo & Ka (2016)
- Gymnopus sinuatus Murrill (1916)
- Gymnopus sphaerosporus M. Villarreal, Arenal & G. Moreno (2006)
- Gymnopus spongiosus (Berk. & M.A. Curtis) Halling (1996)
- Gymnopus squamiger Murrill (1916)
- Gymnopus striatipes (Peck) Halling (1997)
- Gymnopus subabundans Murrill (1946)
- Gymnopus subaquosus de Meijer (2009)
- Gymnopus subavellaneus Murrill (1916)
- Gymnopus subconiceps Murrill (1946)
- Gymnopus subflavescens Murrill (1916)
- Gymnopus subflavifolius Murrill (1916)
- Gymnopus subfunicularis Murrill (1946)
- Gymnopus sublatericius Murrill (1916)
- Gymnopus subluxurians Murrill (1945)
- Gymnopus subnivulosus Murrill (1916)
- Gymnopus subrigidichordus (Corner) Tkalčec, Mešić & Chun Y. Deng (2013)
- Gymnopus subrugosus Murrill (1916)
- Gymnopus subsulphureus (Peck) Murrill (1916)
- Gymnopus subsupinus (Berk.) J.A. Cooper (2014)
- Gymnopus subterginus (Halling) Halling (1997)
- Gymnopus subtortipes Murrill (1946)

== T ==
- Gymnopus talisiae V. Coimbra, Pinheiro, Wartchow & Gibertoni (2015)
- Gymnopus tamatavae (Bouriquet) Antonín, Buyck & Randrianj. (2005)
- Gymnopus terginus (Fr.) Antonín & Noordel. (1997)
- Gymnopus texensis (Berk. & M.A. Curtis) Murrill (1916)
- Gymnopus thiersii (Desjardin) Mešić & Tkalčec (2013)
- Gymnopus tomentellus (Berk. & M.A. Curtis) Tkalčec & Mešić (2013)
- Gymnopus tortipes Murrill (1916)
- Gymnopus trabzonensis Vizzini, Antonín, Seslı & Contu (2015)
- Gymnopus tricholoma Murrill (1941)

== U ==
- Gymnopus ugandensis (Pegler) Desjardin & B.A. Perry (2017)
- Gymnopus uniformis (Peck) Murrill (1916)

== V ==
- Gymnopus variicolor Antonín, Ryoo, Ka & Tomšovský (2016)
- Gymnopus vernus (Ryman) Antonín & Noordel. (2008)
- Gymnopus vinaceus (G.Stev.) J.A.Cooper & P.Leonard (2012) – New Zealand
- Gymnopus virescens A.W. Wilson, Desjardin & E. Horak (2004)
- Gymnopus virginianus Murrill (1916)
- Gymnopus vitellinipes A.W. Wilson, Desjardin & E. Horak (2004)
- Gymnopus volkertii Murrill (1916)
- Gymnopus westii (Murrill) E. César, Bandala & Montoya (2018)
