= Gymnopus moseri =

Scientific classification
- Domain: Eukaryota
- Kingdom: Fungi
- Division: Basidiomycota
- Class: Agaricomycetes
- Order: Agaricales
- Family: Omphalotaceae
- Genus: Gymnopus
- Species: G. moseri

Binomial name
- Gymnopus moseri Antonín & Noordel. (1997)

Synonyms
- Collybia moseri (Antonín & Noordel.) Bon (1998)

Species of fungus

Gymnopus moseri is a European species of agaric fungus in the family Omphalotaceae. It was described as new to science in 1997 by mycologists Vladimír Antonín and Machiel Noordeloos from collections made in Sweden. Fruit bodies of the holotype collection were found growing among Polytrichum and in coarse humus and leaves under birch (Betula) and willow (Salix). Collybia moseri is a synonym proposed by Marcel Bon in 1998. The specific epithet moseri honours Austrian mycologist Meinhard Michael Moser.

== See also ==
- List of Gymnopus species
