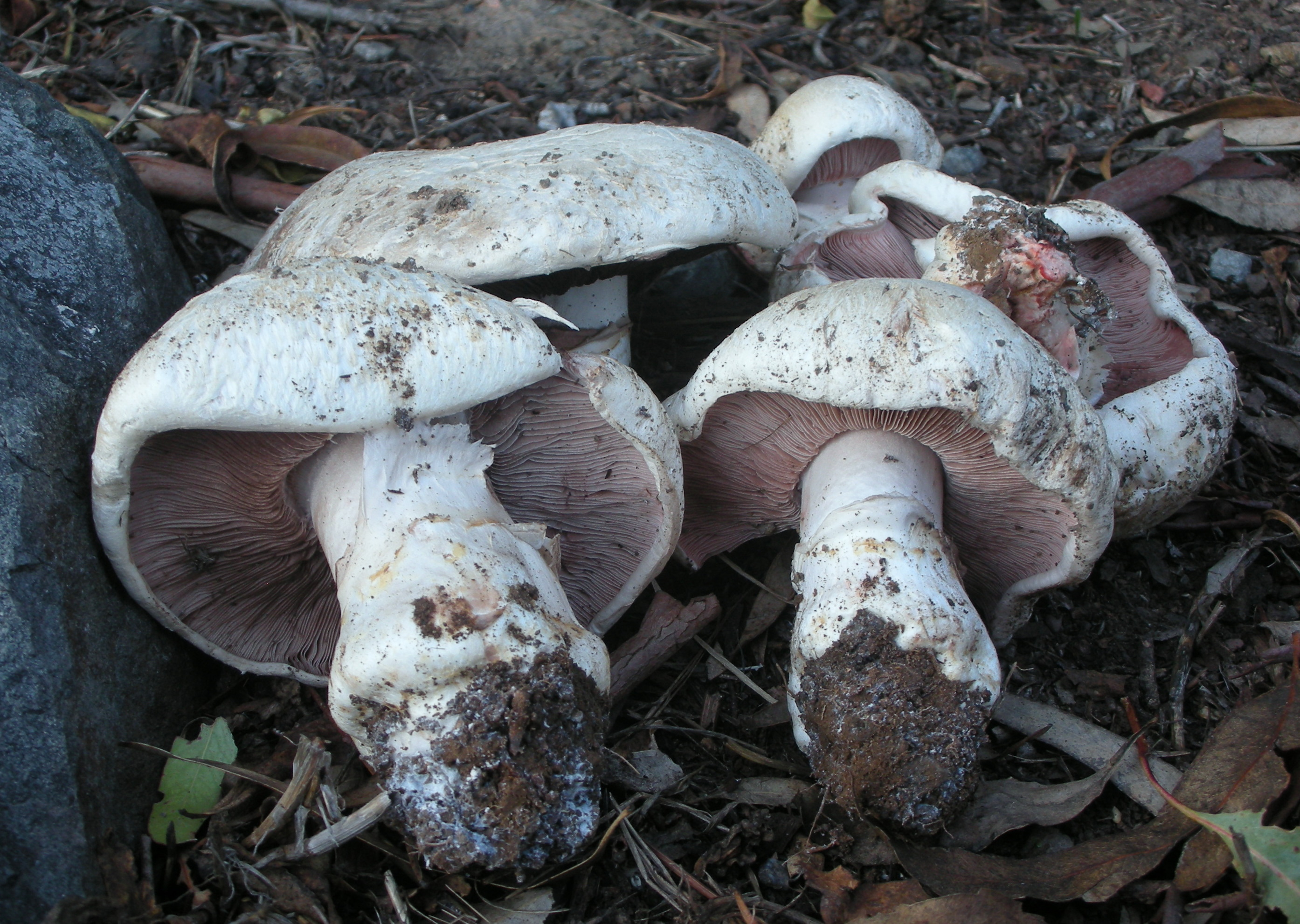

Scientific classification
- Kingdom: Fungi
- Division: Basidiomycota
- Class: Agaricomycetes
- Order: Agaricales
- Family: Agaricaceae
- Genus: Agaricus
- Species: A. bernardii

Binomial name
- Agaricus bernardii (Quél.) Sacc. (1887)

Synonyms
- Psalliota bernardi Quél. (1879); Pratella bernardii (Quél.) Quél. (1888); Fungus bernardii (Quél.) Kuntze (1898); Agaricus campestris subsp. bernardii (Quél.) Konrad & Maubl. (1937)

= Agaricus bernardii =

Species of agaric fungus

Agaricus bernardii
- Mycological characteristics
- Gills on hymenium
- Cap is flat or convex
- Hymenium is free
- Stipe has a ring
- Spore print is brown
- Ecology is saprotrophic
- Edibility is choice

Agaricus bernardii, commonly called the salt-loving agaricus, or salty mushroom, is an agaric fungus in the family Agaricaceae. The mushroom's thick stem is usually shorter than the diameter of the cap, which ranges from 5–15 centimetres (2–6 inches) and is convex to flattened. The cap surface is whitish to buff, and can develop scales or warts in age. The gills are initially pink before turning brown when the spores mature. The flesh turns reddish when it is cut or bruised. It resembles species such as A. bitorquis.

Found in Eurasia, North America, New Zealand, and Australia, A. bernardii is a salt-tolerant species that grows in salt marshes, dunes, and coastal grassland. An edible mushroom, it is stronger in flavor but similar to the store-bought button mushrooms, A. bisporus.

== Taxonomy ==
=== Taxonomic history ===
The species was first described by French mycologist Lucien Quélet as Psalliota bernardi in 1879, based on collections made in La Rochelle, a seaport on the Bay of Biscay (France). Pier Andrea Saccardo transferred it to Agaricus in 1887.

=== Modern classification ===
The infrageneric (below genus-level) classification of A. bernardii is uncertain. In his 1978 proposed classification, Paul Heinemann placed it in the subsection Bitorques of the section Agaricus. Although the species has some similarities with species in the section Duploannulatae based on the structure of its veil and its tendencies towards rufescence (developing a red coloration), molecular analysis shows that it does not belong in this section. An earlier (1999) analysis suggested that it is closely related to the "Agaricus clade", which contains A. subperonatus, A. devoniensis, A. bisporus, A. spissicaulis, A. bitorquis, and A. impudicus. In 1986, Henri Romagnesi placed it in section Chitonioides; Solomon Wasser demoted this to a subsection of Duploannulatae in 1995, and later provided molecular support for his decision. In addition to A. bernardii, species in Wasser's concept of subsection Chitonioides include A. rollanii, A. bernardiiformis, A. gennadii, A. pequinii, and A. nevoi.

=== Etymology ===
The species was named after the original collector, G. Bernard. A. bernardii is commonly known as the salt-loving mushroom.

Synonyms include Psalliota bernardii, Pratella bernardii, Fungus bernardii, and Agaricus campestris subsp. bernardii.

== Description ==
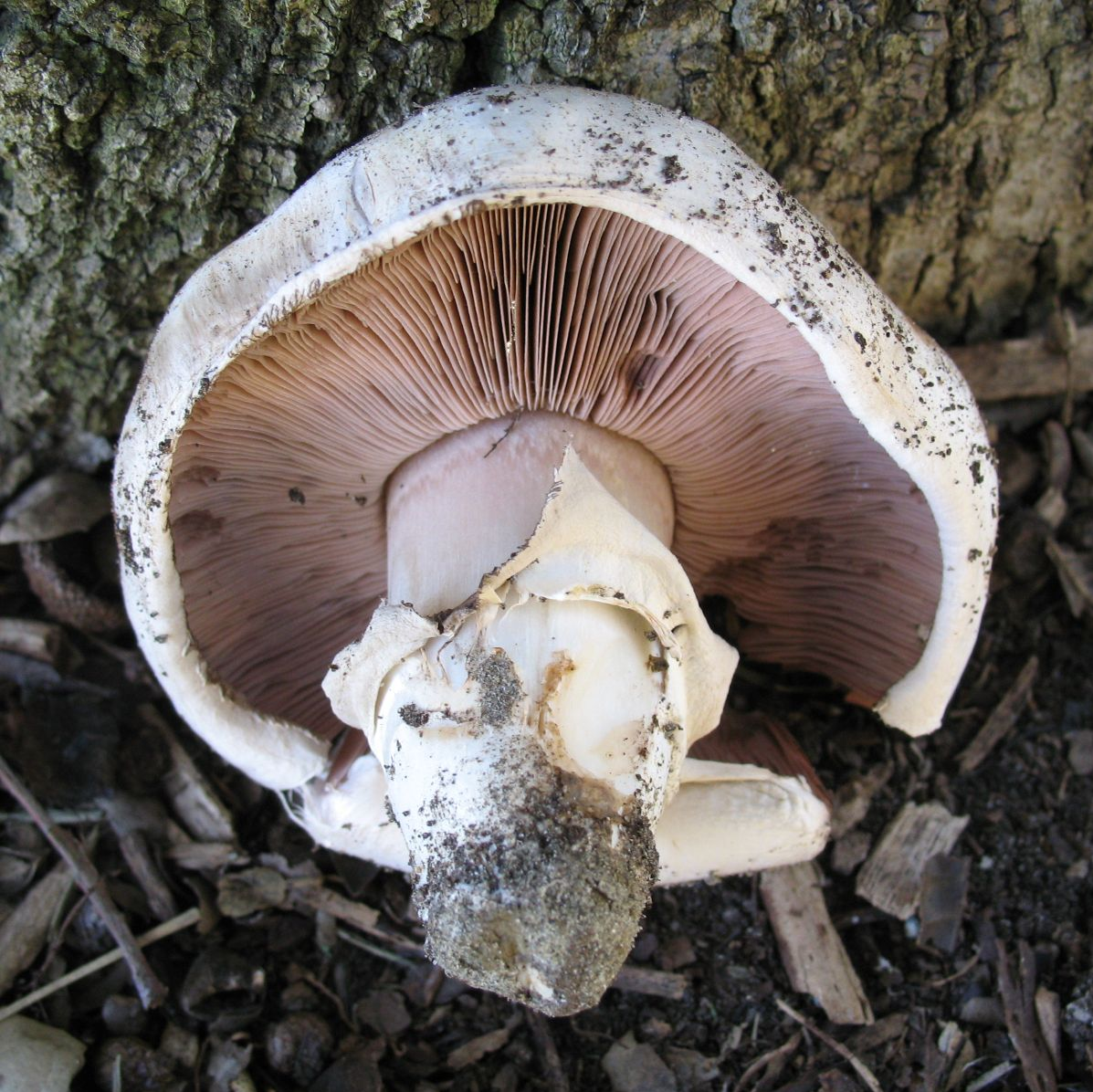
Underside detailing the gills

The fruit bodies of A. bernardii have caps that range in shape from convex to flattened, and reach a diameter of 5–15 centimetres (2–6 inches). The cap surface is dry and smooth, with a white or buff color that can develop brownish spots in maturity. In age, the surface often forms scales or warts. The flesh is thick, firm, and stains reddish-orange or reddish-brown when cut, although this reaction can be slow to develop. Its odor ranges from mild to briny to pungent. The gills are free from attachment to the stem, and packed close together. Initially grayish-pink to pinkish, they turn reddish-brown and then chocolate brown as the spores mature. The stem is solid (i.e., not hollow), firm, and measures 4–10 cm (1 1/2–4 in) long by 2–4 cm (1–1 1/2 in) thick. A thick, white, rubbery partial veil covers the gills of the immature mushroom, and eventually remains as a ring on the middle of the stem.

A. bernardii mushrooms produce a dark brown spore print. The spores are smooth, broadly elliptical, and have dimensions of 6–7.5 by 5–6 μm. The basidia (spore-bearing cells) are four-spored and club-shaped, measuring 14–25 by 4–7 μm; the sterigmata are 4–5 μm. Cheilocystidia (cystidia on the gill edge) are broadly club-shaped to cylindrical, hyaline (translucent), and measure 17–30 by 4–8 μm.

=== Similar species ===
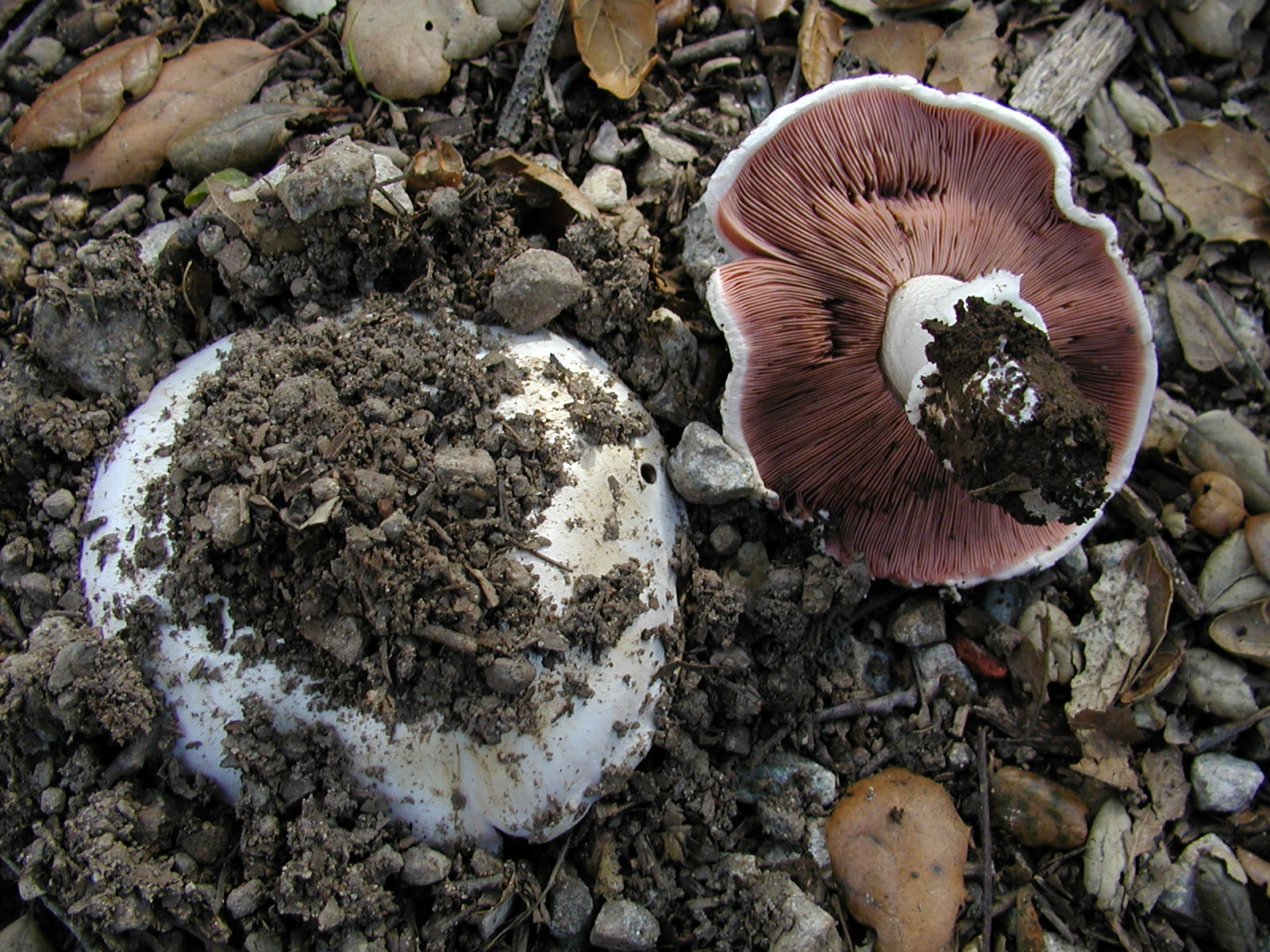
A. bitorquis, a lookalike species

A. bitorquis, also edible, has a similar appearance, but can be distinguished by its double ring, and the lack of a fishy or briny odor. Additionally, A. bitorquis does not stain reddish when cut, and usually does not have a scaly or warty cap. The Hungarian species A. bernardiiformis, named for its similarity to A. bernardii, is distinguished from the latter by its smaller spores (6.2–8.2 by 5.4–6.2 μm) and its club-shaped cheilocystidia that measure 17–35 by 7–9.5 μm. MycoBank, however, considers the two species to be conspecific.

== Distribution and habitat ==
The species is found in Asia, Europe, North America (including Mexico) and New Zealand.

A. bernardii is a saprobic species. Its mushrooms fruit singly, scattered, or in groups on the ground. They grow in sandy soils, lawns, and in habitats with a high salt concentration, like along ocean coasts and salt marshes. Once primarily a maritime species, the fungus has spread inland to roadside verges where salt has been applied to de-ice the roads. Fruit bodies sometimes form underground. Mushrooms can also grow in fairy rings, especially when in grasslands or pastures.

== Ecology ==
A Czech study determined that the mushrooms will strongly bioaccumulate silver from contaminated soil. Although the average concentration of silver in the soil is typically less than 1 milligram per kilogram of soil, it can be significantly elevated near industrial sites such as mines and smelters. The concentration of silver in the caps—which reached levels of up to 544 mg per kg of mushroom tissue (dry weight)—was about twice that of the stems.

== Uses ==
Although the mushrooms sometimes have an odor that is briny or pungent, they are edible and good. David Arora compares it to the closely related A. bitorquis, "but a little chewier".

== See also ==
- List of Agaricus species
