= Gymnopus herinkii =

Scientific classification
- Domain: Eukaryota
- Kingdom: Fungi
- Division: Basidiomycota
- Class: Agaricomycetes
- Order: Agaricales
- Family: Omphalotaceae
- Genus: Gymnopus
- Species: G. herinkii

Binomial name
- Gymnopus herinkii Antonín & Noordel. (1996)

Synonyms
- Collybia herinkii (Antonín & Noordel.) Bon (1998)

Species of lichen

Gymnopus herinkii is a rare species of mushroom-forming fungus in the family Omphalotaceae. It was described in 1998 by mycologists Vladimír Antonín and Machiel Noordeloos. The type specimen was from a collection made in the Lenora region of Bohemia, made by Czech mycologists Jiří Kubička and Josef Herink in 1952; the latter is acknowledged in the species epithet. Marcel Bon proposed a transfer to the genus Collybia in 1998.

Characteristic features of Gymnopus herinkii include the distantly-spaced gills on the underside of the hygrophanous, brown cap, and an onion-like odour. Microscopic characteristics include the lack of cheilocystidia, and the lack of a dryophila-structure in the pileipellis. The fungus grows on fallen leaves or humus.

== See also ==
- List of Gymnopus species
