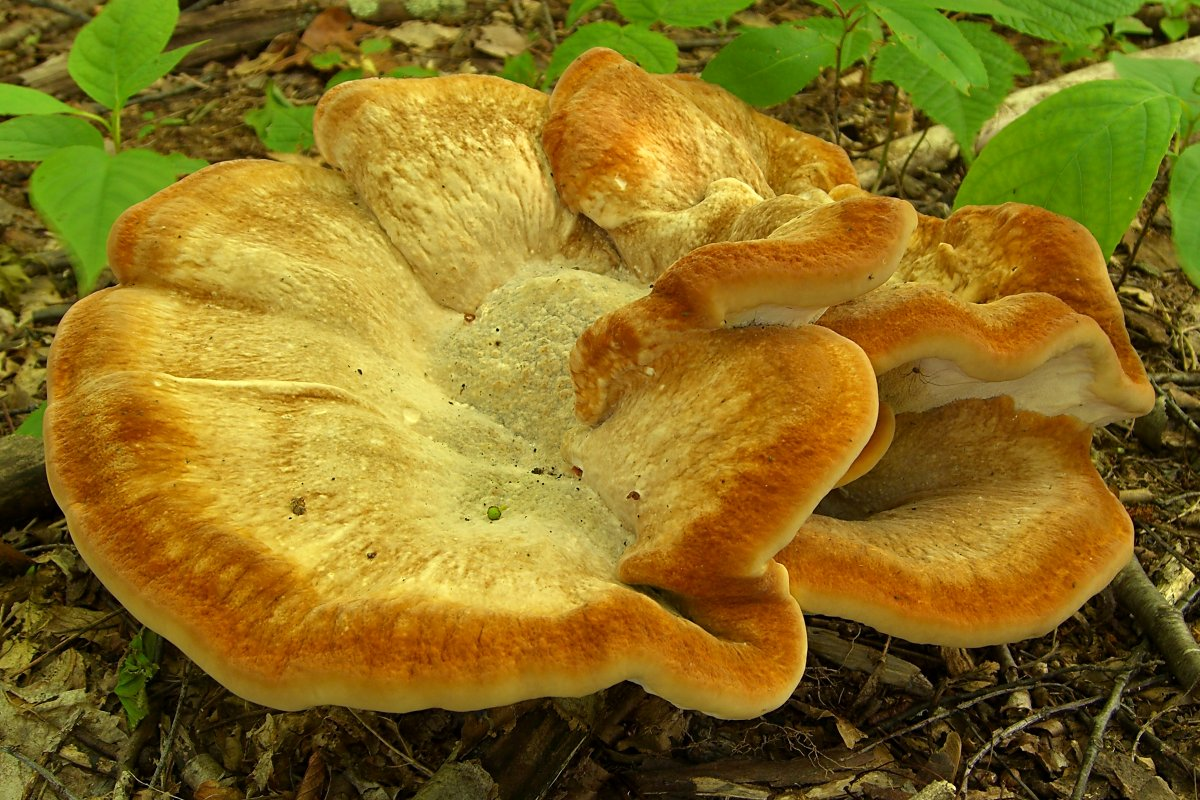
- Bondarzewia berkeleyi

Scientific classification
- Kingdom: Fungi
- Division: Basidiomycota
- Class: Agaricomycetes
- Order: Russulales
- Family: Bondarzewiaceae
- Genus: Bondarzewia; Singer (1940)

Type species
- Bondarzewia montana (Quél.) Singer (1940)

Species
- B. berkeleyi B. guaitecasensis B. mesenterica B. kirkii B. podocarpi B. tibetica B. zonata

= Bondarzewia =

Genus of fungi

Bondarzewia is a widely distributed genus of fungi in the family Bondarzewiaceae. The genus was circumscribed by mycologist Rolf Singer in 1940.
