= Turci =

Turci may refer to:

== People ==
- Annalisa Turci (born 1976), Italian softball player
- Luigi Turci (born 1970), Italian footballer
- Paola Turci (born 1964), Italian pop singer
- Vinicius Turci (born 1985), Chef and Restaurant Owner in United States

== Fungi ==
- Russula turci, a common, edible Russula mushroom
