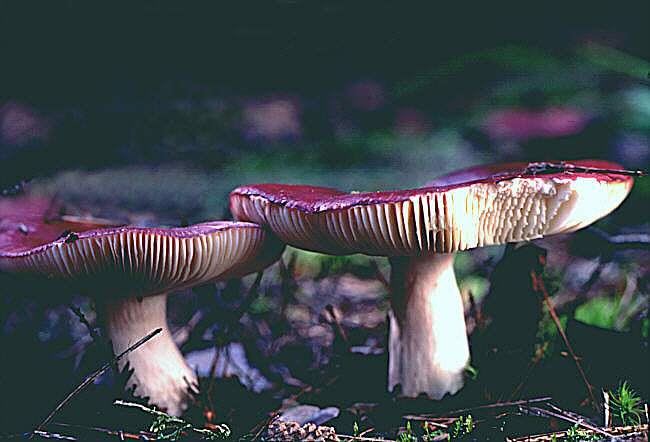

Scientific classification
- Kingdom: Fungi
- Division: Basidiomycota
- Class: Agaricomycetes
- Order: Russulales
- Family: Russulaceae
- Genus: Russula
- Species: R. amethystina

Binomial name
- Russula amethystina Quélet (1897)

= Russula amethystina =

Russula amethystina
- Mycological characteristics
- Gills on hymenium
- Cap is flat
- Hymenium is free
- Stipe is bare
- Spore print is white
- Ecology is mycorrhizal
- Edibility is unknown

Russula amethystina is a conspicuous mushroom, which appears sporadically from mid-summer until the autumn under spruce and fir trees. In Northern Europe, it is very rare. It is not easy to distinguish from similarly coloured Russula species, and practically identical to Russula turci.

== Description ==
The cap ranges from 3 to 12 cm in diameter and varies in colour between violet, lilac, wine-red and wine-red-brown. The cap skin can be pulled off from the edge, right to the centre. The gills are from cream to bright yellow. The spores are yellow, subglobose, with small warts. The spore print is cream to light orange in color. The hollow stipe ranges from 3 to 6 cm in length and 1 to 2 cm in width; it is initially white, later becoming yellowish or brownish.

Similar species include Russula turci, which may smell like iodine near the base of the stalk; otherwise it can only be distinguished by microscopic differences in spore texture. R. lilacea and R. murrillii are also similar.

== See also ==
- List of Russula species
