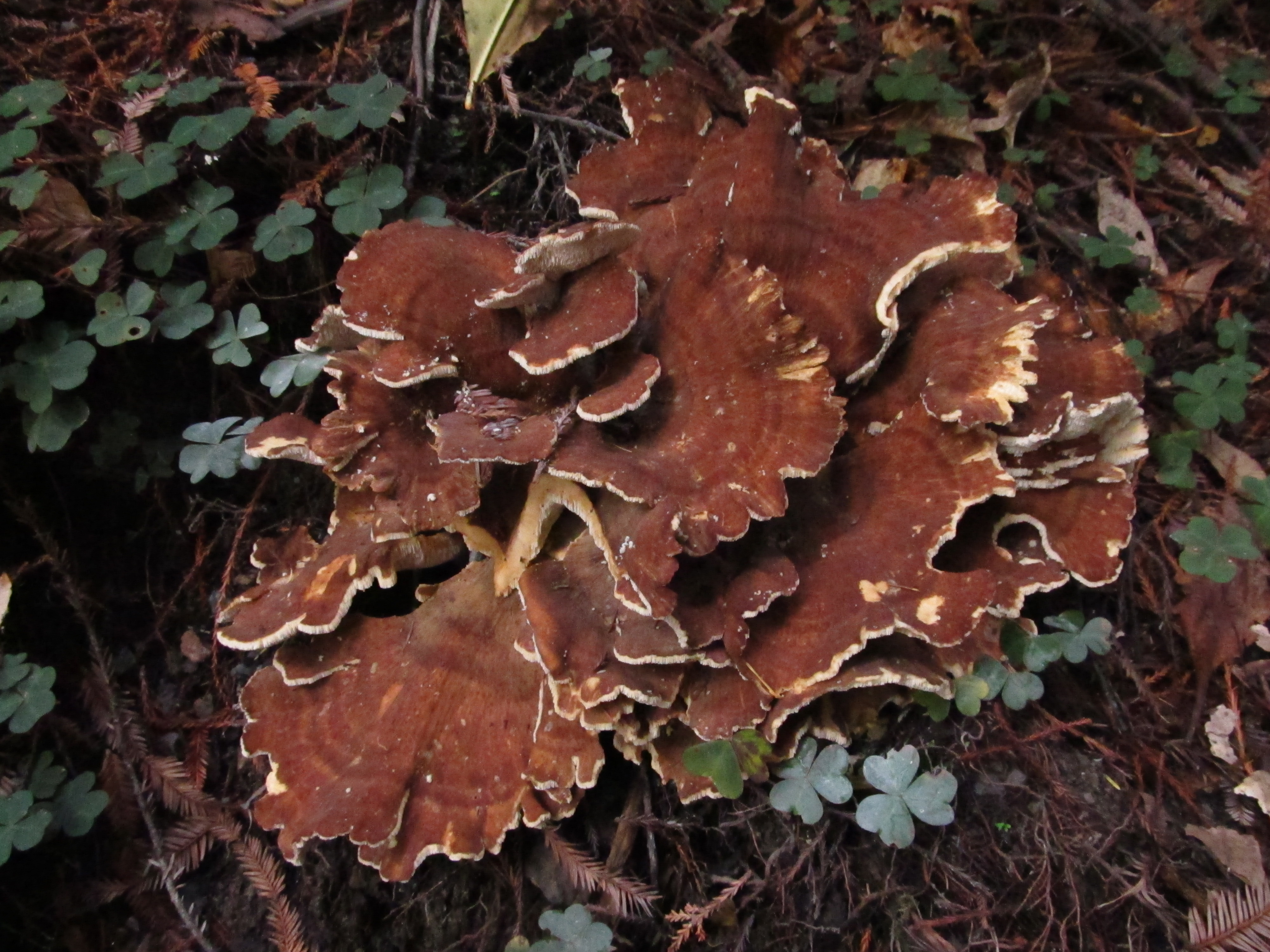

Scientific classification
- Kingdom: Fungi
- Division: Basidiomycota
- Class: Agaricomycetes
- Order: Russulales
- Family: Bondarzewiaceae
- Genus: Bondarzewia
- Species: B. mesenterica

Binomial name
- Bondarzewia mesenterica (Schaeff.) Kreisel (1984)

Synonyms
- Boletus mesentericus Schaeff. (1774); Polyporus anax Berk. ex Cooke (1883); Cerioporus montanus Quél. (1888); Polyporus montanus (Quél.) Ferry (1891); Cladomeris montanus (Quél.) Bigeard & H.Guill. (1909); Grifola mesenterica (Schaeff.) Murrill (1920); Grifola montana (Quél.) Pilát (1934); Bondarzewia montana (Quél.) Singer (1940)

= Bondarzewia mesenterica =

Species of fungus

Bondarzewia mesenterica
- Mycological characteristics
- Pores on hymenium
- Cap is convex or depressed
- Hymenium is decurrent
- Stipe is bare
- Spore print is white
- Ecology is parasitic
- Edibility is edible

Bondarzewia mesenterica (synonym: Bondarzewia montana) is a species of polypore fungus in the family Bondarzewiaceae.

== Taxonomy ==
The species was first described as Boletus mesentericus by Jacob Christian Schäffer in 1774. Hanns Kreisel transferred it to the genus Bondarzewia in 1984.

== Description ==
In maturity, a contiguous fruit body mass may be up to 1 metre (3 1/2 ft) across. The caps are up to 25 cm (10 in) wide and tomentose with brownish zones, fan-shaped, often overlapping and growing from a shared base. The buff pores are up to 2 millimetres (1/16 in) wide. The flesh is whitish with a pleasant odour when fresh. The stalks are continuous with the caps and grow from an underground base, the sclerotium, which is up to 12 cm long and 5 cm thick.

=== Similar species ===
Outside of its genus, it resembles Meripilus giganteus.

== Habitat ==
The species grows at the base of conifers. It affects tree bases and roots with a white rot.

== Uses ==
The mushroom is considered edible, but is tough and often bitter.
