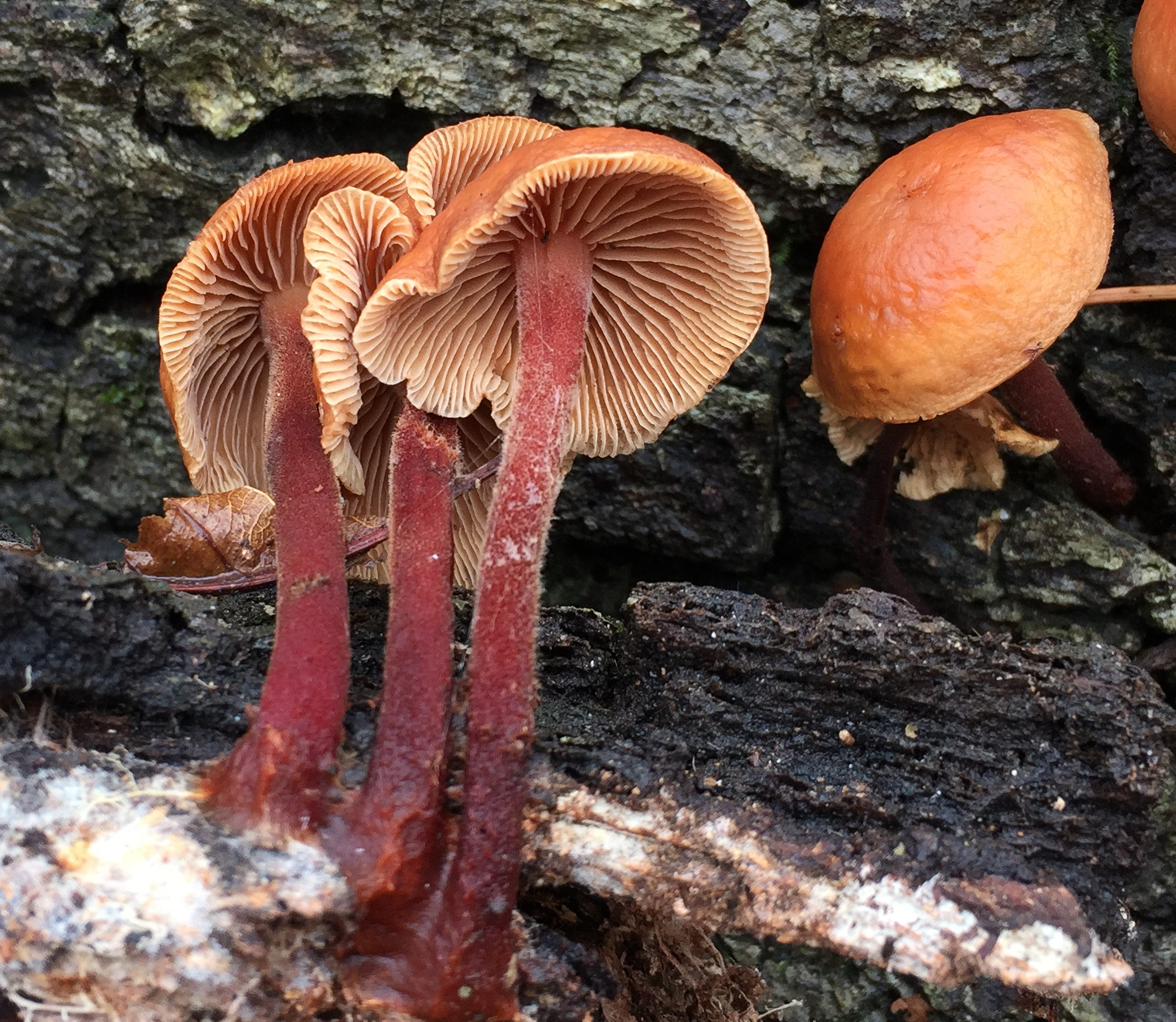

Scientific classification
- Domain: Eukaryota
- Kingdom: Fungi
- Division: Basidiomycota
- Class: Agaricomycetes
- Order: Agaricales
- Family: Omphalotaceae
- Genus: Gymnopus
- Species: G. spongiosus

Binomial name
- Gymnopus spongiosus (Berk. & M.A.Curtis) Halling (1996)

Synonyms
- Marasmius spongiosus Berk. & M.A.Curtis (1849); Chamaeceras spongiosus (Berk. & M.A.Curtis) Kuntze (1898); Collybia spongiosa (Berk. & M.A.Curtis) Singer (1951)

= Gymnopus spongiosus =

Species of fungus

Gymnopus spongiosus, commonly known as the hairy-stalked collybia, is a species of the mushroom-forming fungus family Omphalotaceae. In North America, The fruiting body appears between late summer and fall, and winter along the Gulf Coast. It also appears infrequently in South America. Gymnopus spongiosus is not considered an edible mushroom.
