= Bondarzewia guaitecasensis =

Scientific classification
- Domain: Eukaryota
- Kingdom: Fungi
- Division: Basidiomycota
- Class: Agaricomycetes
- Order: Russulales
- Family: Bondarzewiaceae
- Genus: Bondarzewia
- Species: B. guaitecasensis

Binomial name
- Bondarzewia guaitecasensis (Henn.) J.E.Wright (1964)

Synonyms
- Polyporus guaitecasensis Henn. (1900); Bondarzewia perniciosa Singer (1953)

Species of fungus

Bondarzewia guaitecasensis is a species of polypore fungus in the family Russulaceae that is found in South America. Originally described as Polyporus guaitecasensis by German mycologist Paul Christoph Hennings in 1900, it was transferred to the genus Bondarzewia by Jorge Eduardo Wright in 1964. The fungus is parasitic on species of Nothofagus.
