= Bondarzewia tibetica =

Scientific classification
- Kingdom: Fungi
- Division: Basidiomycota
- Class: Agaricomycetes
- Order: Russulales
- Family: Bondarzewiaceae
- Genus: Bondarzewia
- Species: B. tibetica

Binomial name
- Bondarzewia tibetica B.K.Cui, J.Song & Jia J.Chen (2016)

Species of fungus

Bondarzewia tibetica is a species of polypore fungus in the family Bondarzewiaceae. Found in Tibet, it was described as new to science in 2016.
