= Montécheroux =

- Commune
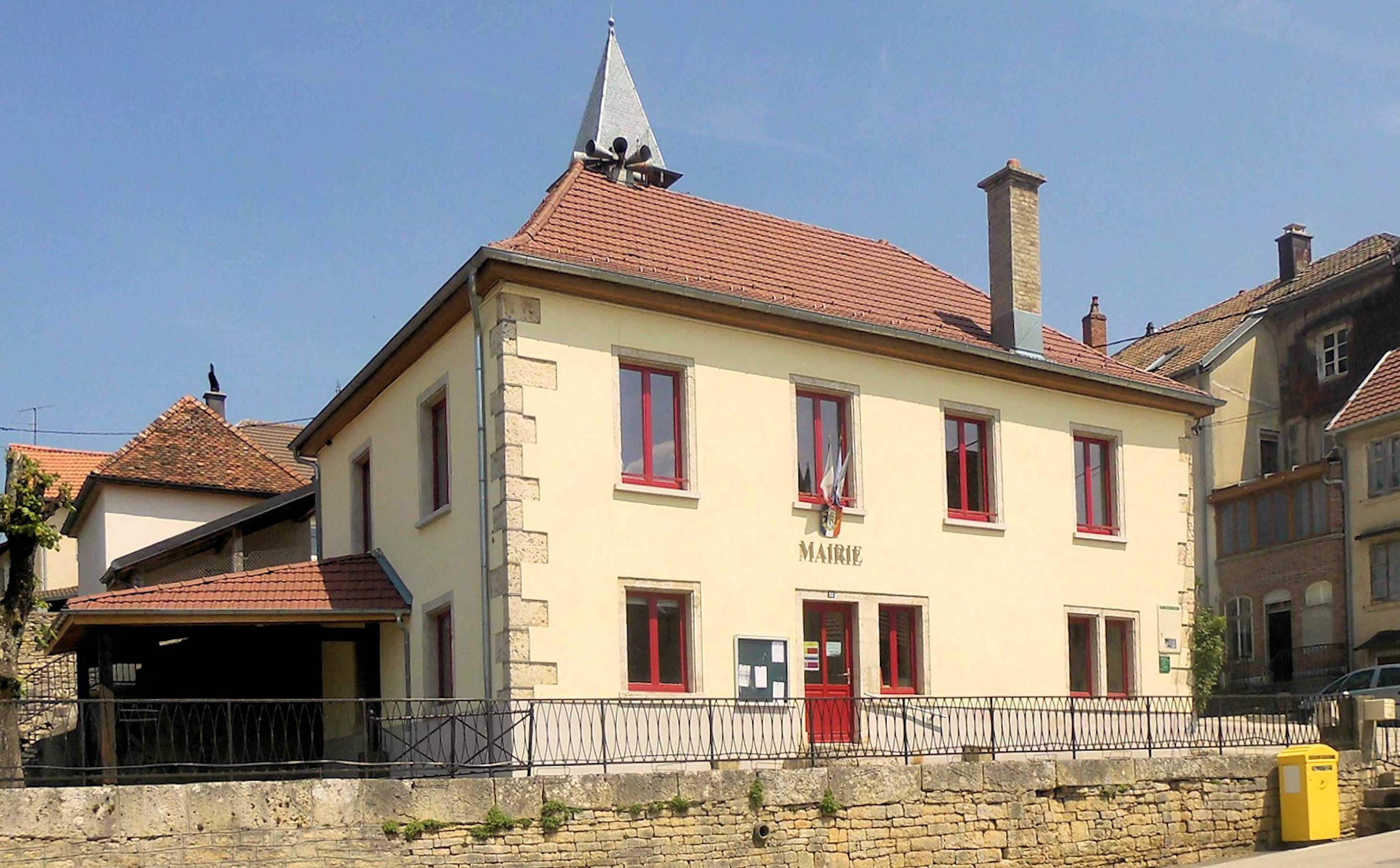
- The town hall in Montécheroux
- Location of Montécheroux
- Location within France Location within Bourgogne-Franche-Comté
- Coordinates: 47°21′02″N 6°48′24″E
- Country: France
- Region: Bourgogne-Franche-Comté
- Department: Doubs
- Arrondissement: Montbéliard
- Canton: Maîche

Government
  - Mayor (2020–2026): Leon Bonvalot
- Area^{1}: 13.13 km^{2} (5.07 sq mi)
- Highest elevation: 830 m (2,720 ft)
- Lowest elevation: 420 m (1,380 ft)
- Population (2023): 563
  - Density: 42.9/km^{2} (111/sq mi)
- Time zone: UTC+01:00 (CET)
  - Summer (DST): UTC+02:00 (CEST)
- INSEE/Postal code: 25393 /25190
- ^{1} French Land Register data, which excludes lakes, ponds, glaciers > 1 km^{2} (0.386 sq mi or 247 acres) and river estuaries.

Montécheroux is a commune in the Doubs department in the Bourgogne-Franche-Comté region in eastern France.

== Geography ==
The commune lies 7 km (4.3 mi) from Saint-Hippolyte.

== Population ==
Historical population
Year	Pop.	±% p.a.
1968	550	—
1975	542	−0.21%
1982	571	+0.75%
1990	548	−0.51%
1999	545	−0.06%
2007	571	+0.58%
2012	581	+0.35%
2017	557	−0.84%
2023	563	+0.18%
Source: INSEE

== Notable person ==
- Lucien Quélet (1832–1899) naturalist and mycologist, was born in Montécheroux.

== See also ==
- Communes of the Doubs department
