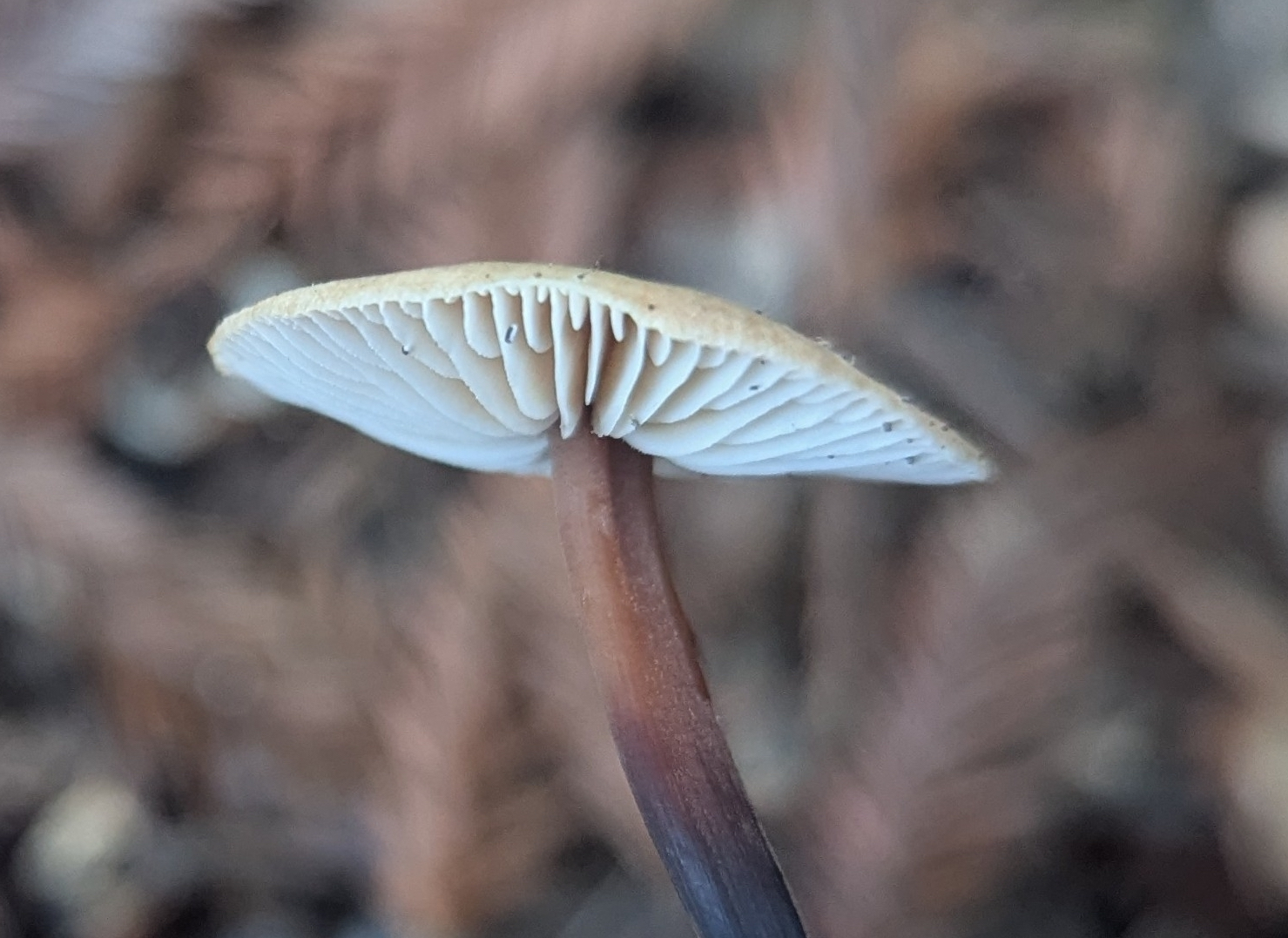
- Santa Clara County, California, 2025

Scientific classification
- Kingdom: Fungi
- Division: Basidiomycota
- Class: Agaricomycetes
- Order: Agaricales
- Family: Omphalotaceae
- Genus: Gymnopus
- Species: G. brassicolens

Binomial name
- Gymnopus brassicolens (Romagnesi) Antonín & Noordeloos (1997)

Synonyms
- Marasmius brassicolens Romagnesi, 1952; Micromphale brassicolens P.D. Orton, 1960; Collybia brassicolens Bon, 1998; Impudipilus brassicolens Hu, Zhang & Li, 2024

= Gymnopus brassicolens =

Species of mushroom

Gymnopus brassicolens
- Mycological characteristics
- Gills on hymenium
- Cap is convex or flat
- Hymenium is emarginate or adnate
- Stipe is bare
- Spore print is white
- Ecology is saprotrophic
- Edibility is unknown

Gymnopus brassicolens, also known as the cabbage parachute, is a relatively uncommon basidiomycete fungus of the genus Gymnopus.

== Description ==
The cabbage parachute has a strong smell of rotten cabbage, from which it derives its name. It is also distinguished from similar mushrooms by its buff-colored gills, and its distinctly tapered and bicoloured stipe, which is orange-yellow at the top, and dark red-brown or black at the base. Its convex or flat cap is 15-45 mm with an undulating margin. The cap is a reddish or yellow brown color which is often translucently striate, and fades towards the margins.

== Distribution and habitat ==
Gymnopus brassicolens generally fruits in summer and autumn among the leafy debris of hardwoods and conifers, including beech, oak and birch. In California, they appear especially under redwood trees, where they fruit from late fall to winter.
