= Gymnopus iocephalus =

Scientific classification
- Kingdom: Fungi
- Division: Basidiomycota
- Class: Agaricomycetes
- Order: Agaricales
- Family: Omphalotaceae
- Genus: Gymnopus
- Species: G. iocephalus

Binomial name
- Gymnopus iocephalus (Berk. & M.A. Curtis) Halling

Synonyms
- Agaricus iocephalus Berk. & M.A. Curtis; Collybia iocephala (Berk. & M.A. Curtis) Singer; Marasmius iocephalus (Berk. & M.A. Curtis) Penn.; Mycena iocephala (Berk. & M.A. Curtis) Sacc.

Species of fungus

Gymnopus iocephalus (A) Mushrooms observed growing among pine needles and leaves at the Natural Area Teaching Laboratory in Gainesville, Florida. (B) Different views of collected fruiting bodies showing cap morphology, gills, and stipes. (C) Positive reaction to potassium hydroxide (KOH), resulting in a green color change in fungal tissue. (D) Gill squash mount showing fungal hyphae and elongated cells, potentially representing immature basidia, observed at 400× total magnification.

Gymnopus iocephalus is a species of fungus in the family Omphalotaceae, commonly known as the violet gymnopus or violet collybia, the latter name reflecting its former classification in the genus Collybia. It is characterized by its distinctive violet coloration and pungent odor, variously described as resembling garlic, radishes, or gunpowder, although the intensity and character of the smell can vary between specimens. Its delicate fruiting bodies have slender stems and violet to lilac caps that gradually fade to paler shades, sometimes becoming pinkish with age. Found primarily in eastern North America, particularly the southeastern United States, the species grows among decomposing leaves, pine needles, and woody debris on the forest floor.

== Taxonomy and nomenclature ==
Gymnopus iocephalus was originally described by Miles Joseph Berkeley and Moses Ashley Curtis in 1853 under the name Agaricus iocephalus, published in Annals and Magazine of Natural History. It was originally found on soil and rotten leaves in South Carolina. This original name serves as the basionym for subsequent taxonomic combinations. In 1887, Italian mycologist Pier Andrea Saccardo transferred the species to the genus Mycena, establishing the combination Mycena iocephala (Berk. & M.A. Curtis) Sacc. The species was later transferred to Marasmius by Penn. in 1915, becoming Marasmius iocephalus, and subsequently to Collybia by Rolf Singer in 1946 as Collybia iocephala. In 1997, Roy E. Halling transferred the species to Gymnopus, establishing the combination Gymnopus iocephalus (Berk. & M.A. Curtis) Halling.

More recently, Impudipilus iocephalus (Berk. & M.A. Curtis) J.J. Hu, B. Zhang & Yu Li was proposed as a new combination in 2024. However, the publication introducing this combination was subsequently retracted because of nomenclatural issues, including noncompliance with nomenclatural rules and duplicate registration of new combinations. Consequently, Gymnopus iocephalus remains the name used in this article, consistent with its treatment in established taxonomic resources.

== Description ==
Gymnopus iocephalus produces small to medium-sized, flimsy fruiting bodies with caps typically measuring 1.2–4 cm (0.5–1.6 in) in diameter. The cap is initially convex with an inward-curving margin but becomes wavy and slightly depressed as it matures. Young specimens display violet/purple coloration that gradually fades to pale lilac or pinkish-lilac with age. The cap surface often appears radially grooved, particularly toward its margin.

The gills (lamellae) are reddish-purple to violet and range from narrowly attached to notched or nearly free from the stem. They are generally somewhat widely spaced. The stipe is slender, approximately 2–7 cm (0.8–2.8 in) long and 1.5–4 mm (0.06–0.16 in) thick, with fine surface hairs and coloration ranging from whitish-lilac to grayish-purple. The flesh is thin and pale purple, while the spore print is white.

Similar looking species

Several small, purple-colored mushrooms may be confused with Gymnopus iocephalus. One close lookalike is Laccaria amethystina, which also produces violet fruiting bodies and a white spore print. However, L. amethystina has thicker, more widely spread-out gills and can be distinguished through a potassium hydroxide (KOH) test, which produces a brownish reaction on the cap rather than the green to blue reaction characteristic of G. iocephalus. Microscopic examination further distinguishes the two species, as L. amethystina produces globose, ornamented spores with clear spikes, whereas G. iocephalus produces smooth, ovoid to tear-shaped spores. Another superficially similar fungus is Inocybe geophylla var. lilacina, which displays pale lilac coloration. However, this variety develops brownish gills at maturity and produces a brown spore print, unlike G. iocephalus which has a white spore print.

Another lookalike is Baeospora myriadophylla, commonly known as the lavender baeospora, which also displays violet coloration. However, B. myriadophylla typically grows on decaying hardwood logs and stumps and has more crowded gills, whereas G. iocephalus grows on the ground, has more widely spaced gills, and produces a more distinctive unpleasant odor.

More closely related, however, is another morphologically similar species called Gymnopus iodes, described from China. Like G. iocephalus, it produces small fruiting bodies with violet coloration, radially grooved caps, and a distinctive odor. However, G. iodes possesses cheilocystidia, whereas these structures are absent in G. iocephalus. Differences in microscopic characteristics and chemical reactions help distinguish the two species, demonstrating the importance of examining multiple diagnostic features when identifying purple-colored mushrooms.

== Aroma and chemical reactions ==
One of the most recognizable features of G. iocephalus is its pungent, often unpleasant odor, described above. The perceived scent can vary, and some specimens may lack a distinctive odor. Jang et al. (2016), for example, reported no noticeable odor in a dried Korean specimen.

Another useful diagnostic feature, which remains observable even in dried specimens, is its reaction to potassium hydroxide (KOH). When a drop of KOH is applied to the cap surface, the tissue changes from purple to vivid green or blue. This distinctive color reaction is particularly useful for distinguishing G. iocephalus from other superficially similar purple mushrooms.

== Microscopic characteristics ==
Microscopic characteristics, particularly basidiospore shape and ornamentation, are useful in distinguishing G. iocephalus from similar-looking purple fungi. G. iocephalus produces smooth, hyaline (transparent), inamyloid basidiospores, showing no reaction to Melzer's reagent, that are generally ovoid to lacrymoid (tear-shaped), measuring approximately 6.5–9 × 3–4.5 µm (2.6–3.5 × 1.2–1.8 ten-thousandths of an inch). Unlike the ornamented spores of Laccaria amethystina, the spores of G. iocephalus lack surface ornamentation. The spores are produced externally on basidia, the specialized reproductive cells lining the gills. Both cheilocystidia, which occur along the gill edges, and pleurocystidia, which occur on the flat surfaces of the gills, are absent. The pileipellis, or outermost tissue layer of the cap, consists of branched, interwoven hyphae approximately 3–7.5 µm (1.2–3.0 ten-thousandths of an inch) wide, arranged predominantly parallel to the cap surface. The pileipellis is not illustrated in the figure above.

== Habitat and distribution ==
Gymnopus iocephalus is a saprobic fungus that obtains energy by decomposing dead organic material. Its fruiting bodies grow scattered, in groups on fallen leaves, pine needles, and woody debris. It occurs in deciduous, coniferous, and mixed forests. Unlike ectomycorrhizal fungi, it is not known to depend on a symbiotic association with living tree roots.

In North America, the species has been documented primarily in the southeastern United States, including Florida, with records extending north to Massachusetts and west to Missouri and Texas, and reported as far south as Colombia and Brazil on iNaturalist. It typically fruits during summer and autumn to early winter.

As mentioned above, the species has also been reported from East Asia. Jang et al. (2016) documented a specimen collected on leaf litter in Bukhansan National Park, Seoul, South Korea, on August 4, 2014 . However, later researchers question whether the Korean collection represents the same species as North American material because of differences in cap coloration and DNA-based phylogenetic placement. Consequently, the full geographic distribution of G. iocephalus remains incompletely resolved.

== Phylogeny ==
Phylogenetic placement of Gymnopus iocephalus within the family Omphalotaceae. Bayesian phylogenetic tree based on combined nuclear ribosomal internal transcribed spacer (nrITS) and large subunit (nrLSU) DNA sequences. Gymnopus iocephalus (TFB6520) is positioned within Clade G (Gymnopus sensu stricto), near G. foetidus, G. barbipes, and G. dysodes. Branch support values represent Bayesian posterior probabilities and maximum likelihood bootstrap percentages. From Oliveira et al. (2019)

Molecular phylogenetic analyses have helped clarify the evolutionary placement of Gymnopus iocephalus within Omphalotaceae. Oliveira et al. (2019) examined relationships among members of the family using nuclear ribosomal internal transcribed spacer (nrITS) and large subunit (nrLSU) DNA sequences. Their combined analysis placed G. iocephalus (specimen TFB6520) within Clade G (Gymnopus sensu stricto), near G. foetidus, G. barbipes, and G. dysodes. The clade received strong statistical support, with a Bayesian posterior probability of 1.0 and a maximum likelihood bootstrap value of 88%.

== Reproduction ==
Gymnopus iocephalus exhibits a tetrapolar mating system, as reported by Petersen and Gordon (1994) from experiments involving specimen TFB 6520, then classified as Collybia iocephala. Mata et al. (2006) subsequently reported findings consistent with this reproductive system. Tetrapolar mating involves two independently inherited mating-type factors that regulate sexual compatibility between fungal individuals. Compatible fungal mycelia generally must differ at both factors for successful mating. This reproductive mechanism promotes outcrossing by limiting sexual compatibility between genetically similar individuals.

== Ecological significance and human relevance ==
Gymnopus iocephalus has no well-documented culinary, medicinal, or commercial applications. Its edibility and potential toxicity remain poorly understood, and it is not commonly recognized as an edible mushroom.

Although human uses of G. iocephalus have not been established, other species within the genus Gymnopus have documented economic and medicinal importance. For example, members of the Gymnopus dryophilus species complex are collected and consumed as food in China, while Gymnopus androsaceus has been developed for medicinal applications . However, these uses have not been demonstrated for G. iocephalus.

The ecological significance of G. iocephalus lies primarily in its saprobic lifestyle. By obtaining nutrients from decomposing leaves, pine needles, and other dead organic material, the species participates in the breakdown of plant litter. Saprobic fungi play an important role in nutrient cycling and the decomposition of organic matter within forest ecosystems.
