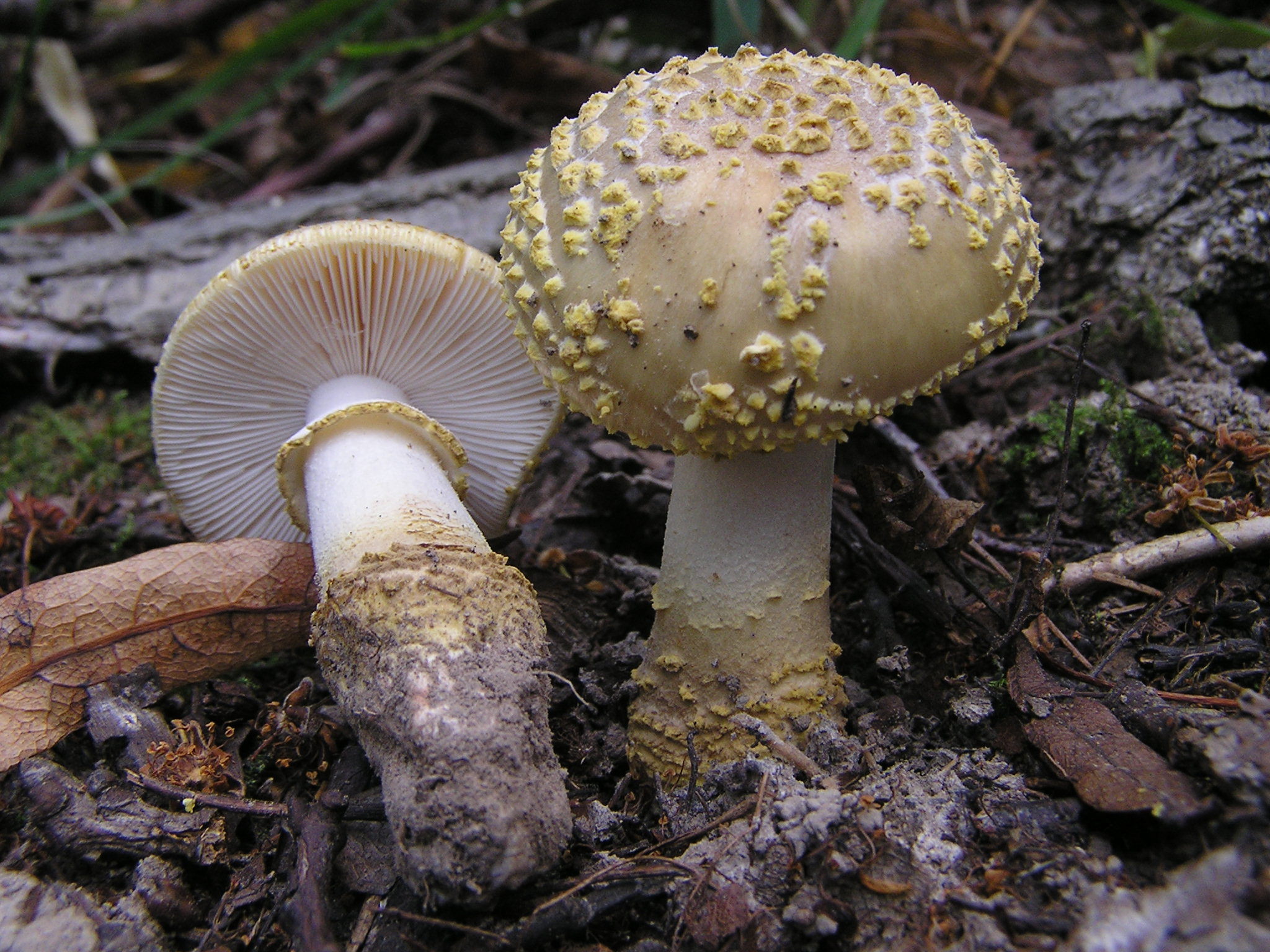
- European Amanita franchetii (Boud.) Fayod, Craula, Hörselberg-Hainich, Thüringia, Germany

Scientific classification
- Kingdom: Fungi
- Division: Basidiomycota
- Class: Agaricomycetes
- Order: Agaricales
- Family: Amanitaceae
- Genus: Amanita
- Species: A. franchetii

Binomial name
- Amanita franchetii (Boud.) Fayod

Varieties
- A. franchetii (Boud.) Fayod var. franchetii A. franchetii sensu Thiers; A. franchetii (Boud.) Fayod var. lactella (E.-J. Gilbert & Kühner) Bon & Contu in Contu

Synonyms
- Amanita aspera var. franchetii Boud. Amanita queletii var. franchetii (Boud.) Bon

= Amanita franchetii =

Species of fungus

Amanita franchetii
- Mycological characteristics
- Gills on hymenium
- Cap is flat or convex
- Hymenium is free
- Stipe has a ring and volva
- Spore print is white
- Ecology is mycorrhizal
- Edibility is inedible

Amanita franchetii, also known as Franchet's amanita, is a species of fungus in the family Amanitaceae.

== Taxonomy ==
It was given its current name by Swiss mycologist Victor Fayod in 1889 in honor of French botanist Adrien René Franchet.

As A. aspera var. franchetii, it had the name yellow-veiled amanita.

There exists a variety known as A. franchetii var. lactella that is entirely white except for the bright yellow universal veil remnants.

== Description ==
The cap is 5–12 centimetres (2–4 1/2 inches) wide, and is yellow-brown to brown in color. The flesh is white or pale yellow and has a mild odor. The closely spaced gills are the same color as the flesh. The stipe is thick and larger at the base, also white to yellowish; loose areas of yellow veil form on the base. A thick ring is left by the partial veil.

=== Similar species ===
A similar fungus in western North America was also referred to as A. franchetii, but was long suspected of being a separate, undescribed species, and in 2013 was formally described under the name A. augusta.

== Distribution and habitat ==
A. franchetii occurs in Europe and North Africa with oaks (Quercus ssp.), chestnuts (Castanea ssp.), and pines (Pinus ssp.).

A. franchetii var. lactella is found in the western Mediterranean region, associated with several species of oak (Quercus suber and Q. robur) and hornbeam (Carpinus betulus), and is also reported from Serbia.

== Edibility ==
A. franchetii is considered inedible, and is reported as being toxic when raw or undercooked. Although the species was implicated in the 2005 deaths of ten people in China who displayed symptoms similar to those caused by alpha-Amanitin poisoning, this case report has been called into question for possible misidentification of the mushrooms involved.

== See also ==
- List of Amanita species
