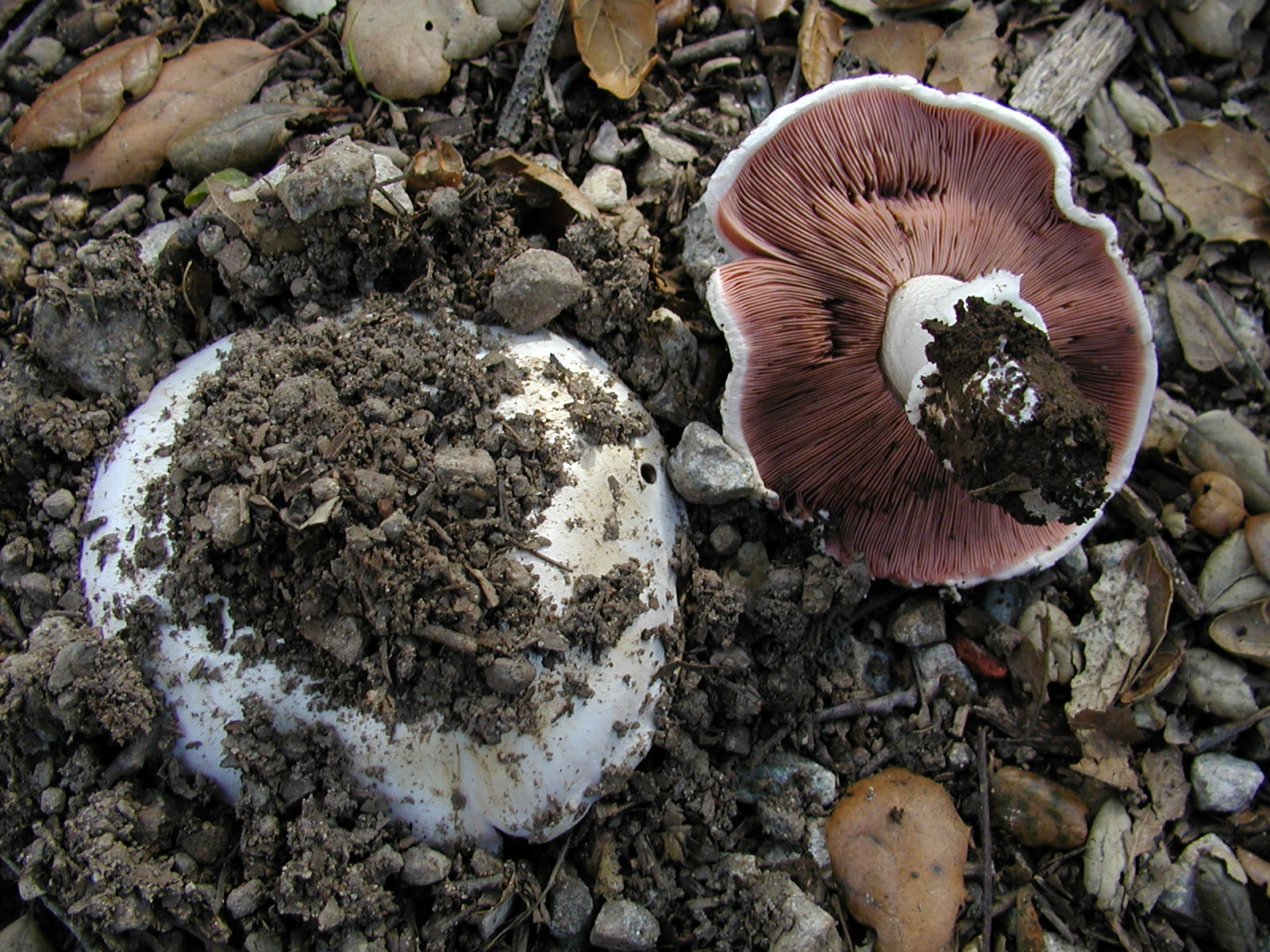

Scientific classification
- Kingdom: Fungi
- Division: Basidiomycota
- Class: Agaricomycetes
- Order: Agaricales
- Family: Agaricaceae
- Genus: Agaricus
- Species: A. bitorquis

Binomial name
- Agaricus bitorquis (Quél.) Sacc. (1887)

= Agaricus bitorquis =

Species of fungus

Agaricus bitorquis
- Mycological characteristics
- Gills on hymenium
- Cap is convex or flat
- Hymenium is free
- Stipe has a ring
- Spore print is brown
- Ecology is saprotrophic
- Edibility is choice

Agaricus bitorquis, commonly known as torq, banded agaric, spring agaric, banded agaricus, urban agaricus, or pavement mushroom, is an edible white mushroom of the genus Agaricus, similar to the common button mushroom that is sold commercially.

== Taxonomy ==
Bitorquis is Latin "having two collars", or "twisted necklace" and refers to the two rings resulting from detachment of the veil from both the top and bottom of the stipe. The species was first defined by the French mycologist Lucien Quélet in 1884, in the form of Psalliota bitorquis (using another genus name in place of the modern Agaricus).

== Description ==
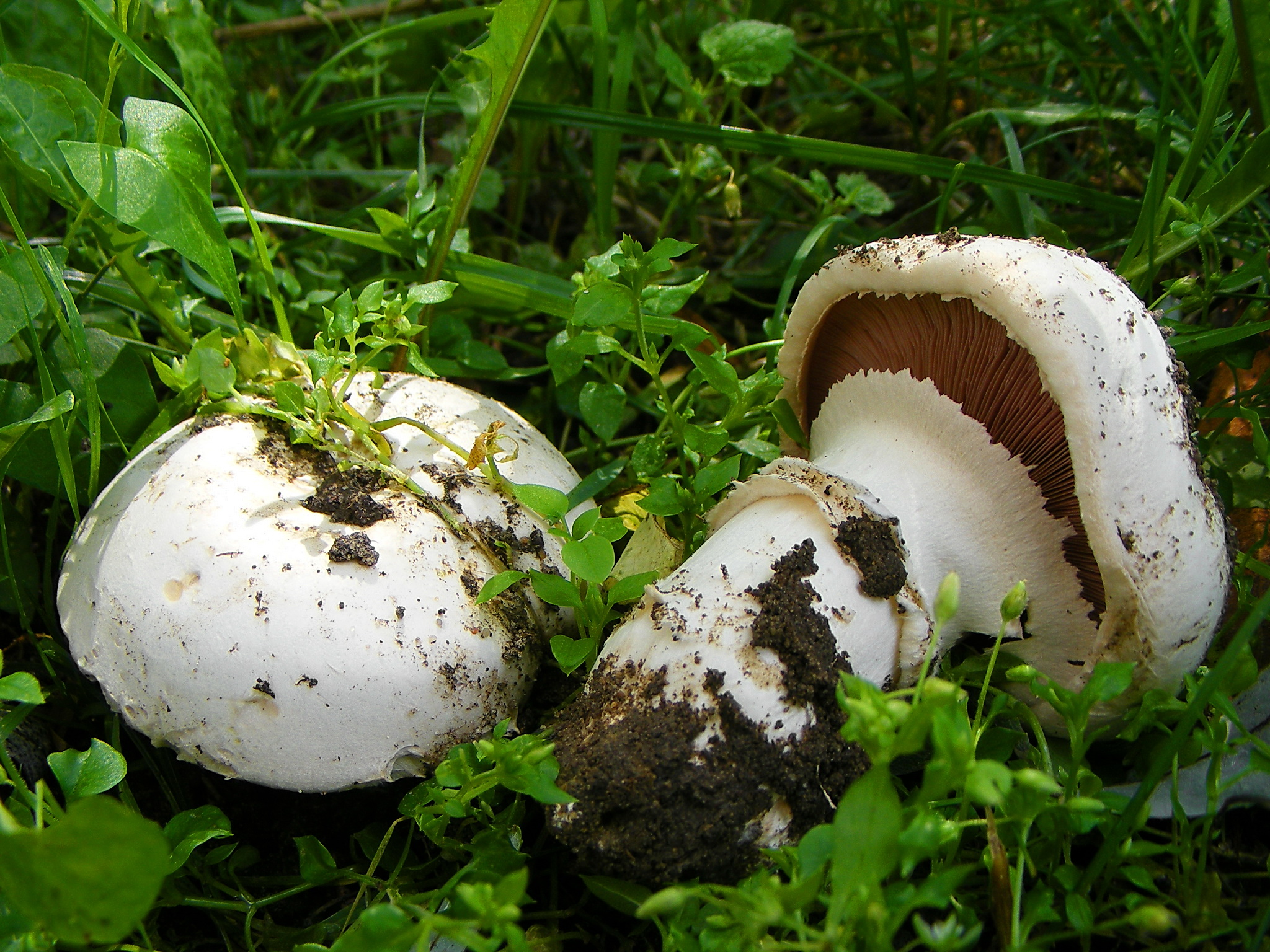
Specimen showing the ring structure

The cap is dry, smooth, and white (but stains yellowish in age), and measures 4 to 18 centimetres (1 1/2 to 7 in) in diameter, convex to flat, often with dirt on the cap. The gills are free, very narrow and close. They are a light pink color when young, becoming dark reddish-brown as the spores mature. The spore print is chocolate brown.

The stipe is 3–11 cm long, 1–4 cm thick, cylindrical to clavate (club-shaped), stout, white, smooth, with a membranous veil and thick white mycelial sheathing near the base. Distinctively it has both a thick upper ring which is shaped like a funnel and a thinner skirt-like lower ring, giving rise to the species name bitorquis. The flesh is solid and firm, with a mild odor.

=== Microscopic details ===
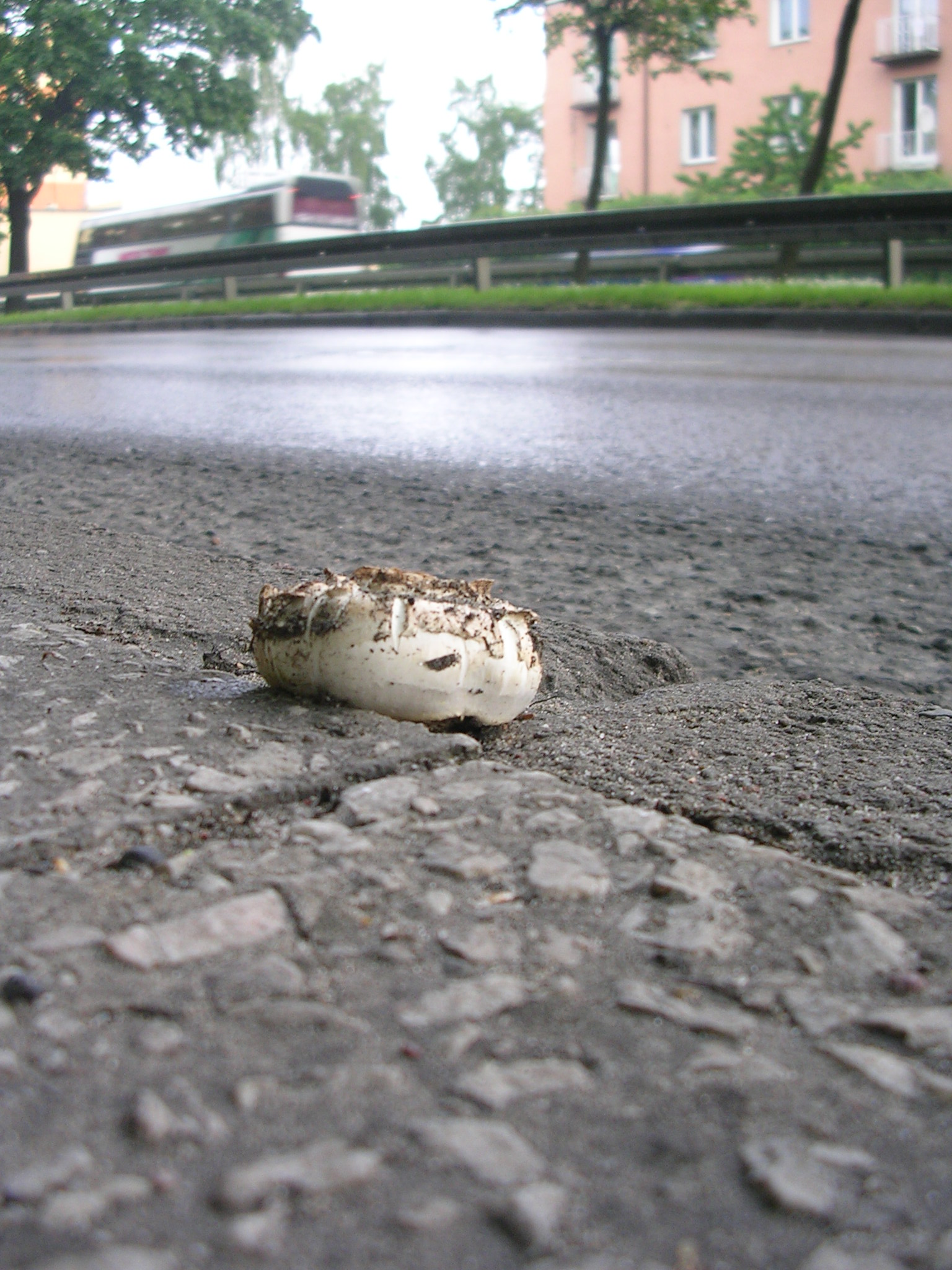
Agaricus bitorquis mushroom emerging through asphalt concrete in summer

The basidiospores are elliptical in shape, smooth, and with dimensions of 5–7 x 4–5.5 μm. Basidia are 20–25 x 6.5–8.5 μm, usually four-spored, but often with two-spored basidia present. Cystidia are present and numerous.

=== Similar species ===
The species is often confused with the briny-smelling Agaricus bernardii. It also resembles Agaricus campestris somewhat, but that species only has a single fragile ring.

== Distribution and habitat ==
Agaricus bitorquis may be found growing solitary or in small groups in gardens (noted as growing in a gregarious manner), and at roadsides, usually on the pavement, often where salt is applied to combat ice in winter. Pushing through asphalt and slabs, it is subterranean, and often matures underground. Occurs in throughout North America, Europe, and Asia, as well as in New Zealand, South Africa, and Australia.

== Cultivation ==
First cultivated commercially in 1968, A. bitorquis has several growth characteristics that have piqued the interest of mushroom cultivators looking for an alternative to the standard button mushroom, A. bisporus. For example, A. bitorquis is more resistant to various viral diseases, can grow at higher temperatures and CO_{2} concentrations, and has better resistance to bruising. Furthermore, high temperature-resistant strains have recently been developed which may help cultivators overcome problems associated with cooling production rooms during hot summer months.

== Edibility ==
Agaricus bitorquis is a choice edible species, with a typical 'mushroomy' taste. Specimens collected in the wild may be gritty due to its often subterranean habitat. As with all specimens picked from the wild, care should be taken to consider the suitability of the collection site, as this species can bioaccumulate toxic heavy metals, especially lead, from polluted areas. Nutritional analysis has shown this species to contain 18 amino acids, including all of the essential ones.

== See also ==
- List of Agaricus species
