= Bondarzewia kirkii =

Conservation status
- Least Concern (IUCN 3.1)

Scientific classification
- Domain: Eukaryota
- Kingdom: Fungi
- Division: Basidiomycota
- Class: Agaricomycetes
- Order: Russulales
- Family: Bondarzewiaceae
- Genus: Bondarzewia
- Species: B. kirkii

Binomial name
- Bondarzewia kirkii J.A. Cooper, Jia J. Chen & B.K. Cui (2019)

Species of fungus

Bondarzewia kirkii is a species of polypore fungus in the family Russulaceae that is endemic to the beech forests of New Zealand. It is named after British mycologist Paul Michael Kirk.

== Ecology ==
Bondarzewia kirkii is a parasitic fungus that fruits on the roots of beech trees throughout New Zealand. It appears to be long lived and to fruit on mature trees. It only has been collected from January through March, significantly earlier than most other macrofungi in New Zealand.
