= Bondarzewia podocarpi =

Scientific classification
- Domain: Eukaryota
- Kingdom: Fungi
- Division: Basidiomycota
- Class: Agaricomycetes
- Order: Russulales
- Family: Bondarzewiaceae
- Genus: Bondarzewia
- Species: B. podocarpi

Binomial name
- Bondarzewia podocarpi Y.C.Dai & B.K.Cui (2010)

Species of fungus

Bondarzewia podocarpi is a species of polypore fungus in the family Russulaceae. Described as new to science in 2010, it is found in Hainan, China, where it grows parasitically on Podocarpus imbricatus.
