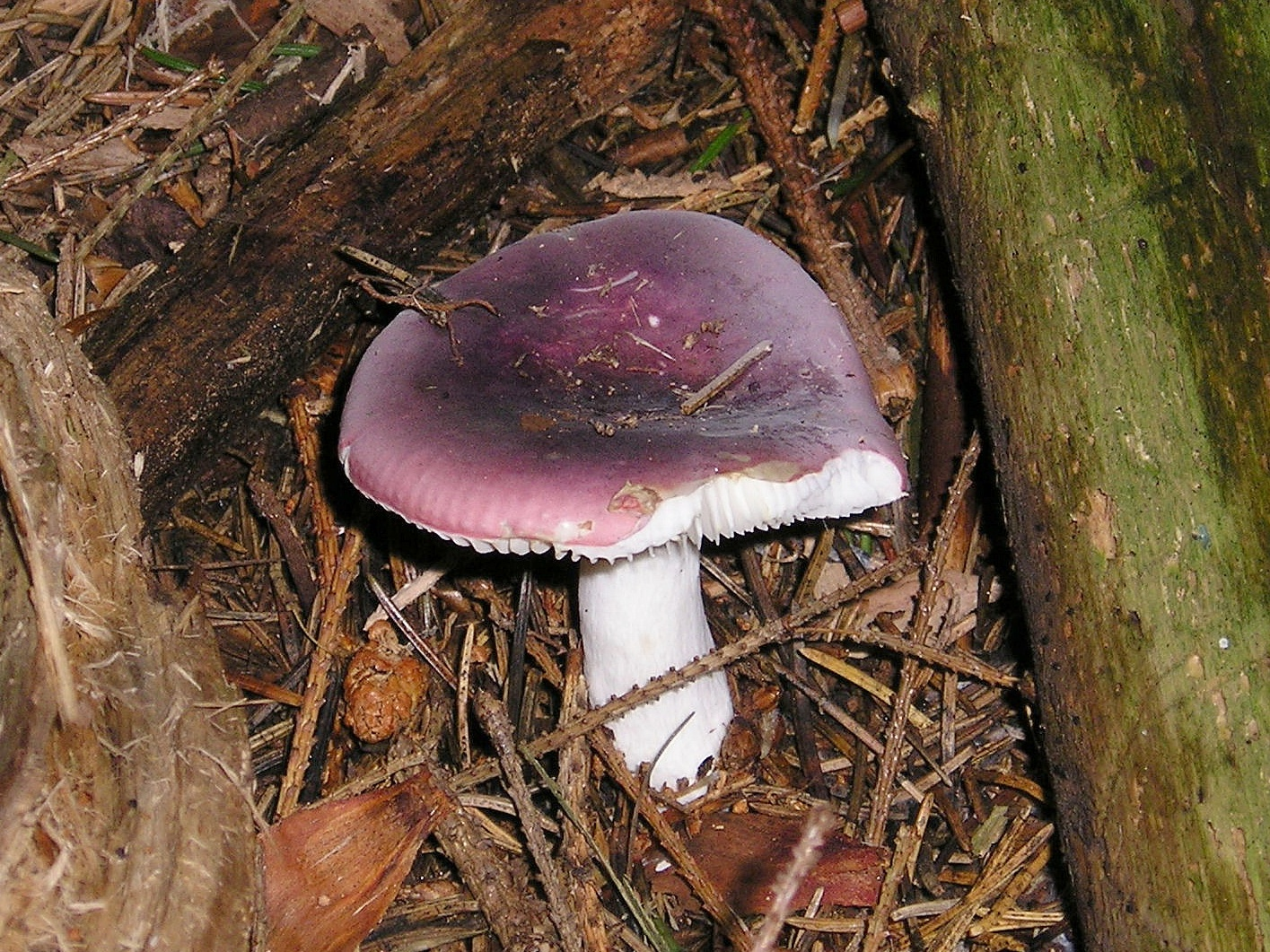

Scientific classification
- Kingdom: Fungi
- Division: Basidiomycota
- Class: Agaricomycetes
- Order: Russulales
- Family: Russulaceae
- Genus: Russula
- Species: R. turci

Binomial name
- Russula turci Bres. 1882

= Russula turci =

Species of fungus

Russula turci, commonly known as the purple-plush brittlegill, is a common, edible, Russula mushroom. It is found under pines and spruces, on sandy soil and clay.

== Description ==
The cap is convex when young and becomes broadly convex to flat or depressed as the mushroom gets older. It is dark amethyst-violet to brownish pink. The margin is paler and noticeably matte. The cap grows up to 8 cm in diameter. The gills are cream to light ochre, rather crowded and connected at the base by cross veins. The spores are ochre. The stem is white and evenly thick. The flesh is white, and the base of the stem has a distinct smell of iodine.

== Similar species ==
The rare Russula azurea also has a purple cap and grows beneath spruces. Russula amethystina can hardly be distinguished from this mushroom, its blue to reddish-violet cap occasionally has pale patches and also a smell of iodine in the stem base. It can be found in coniferous mountain forests, mostly under silver fir.

== See also ==
- List of Russula species
