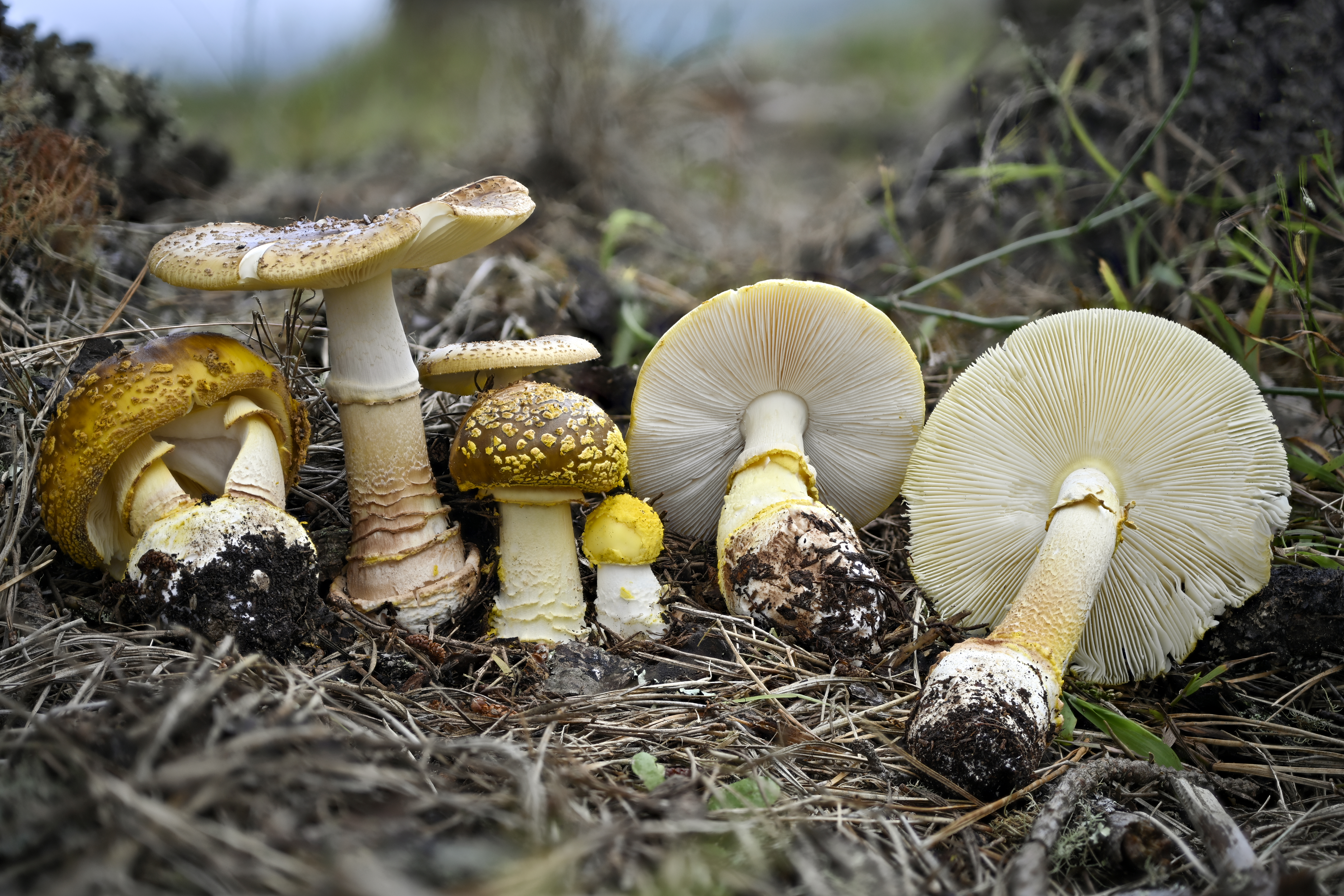
- Amanita augusta in Pacifica, California

Conservation status
- Least Concern (IUCN 3.1)

Scientific classification
- Kingdom: Fungi
- Division: Basidiomycota
- Class: Agaricomycetes
- Order: Agaricales
- Family: Amanitaceae
- Genus: Amanita
- Species: A. augusta

Binomial name
- Amanita augusta Bojantchev & R.M.Davis (2013)

Synonyms
- Amanita aspera (Thiers 1982, Arora 1986); Amanita franchetti (Boud.); (1881)

= Amanita augusta =

Amanita augusta
- Mycological characteristics
- Gills on hymenium
- Cap is convex
- Hymenium is free
- Stipe has a ring and volva
- Spore print is white
- Ecology is mycorrhizal
- Edibility is inedible

Amanita augusta, commonly known as the western yellow-veil or western yellow-veiled amanita, is a small tannish-brown mushroom with cap colors bright yellow to dark brown and various combinations of the two colors. The mushroom is often recognizable by the fragmented yellow remnants of the universal veil. This mushroom grows year-round in the Pacific Northwest, but fruiting tends to occur in late fall to mid-winter. The fungus grows in an ectomycorrhizal relationship with hardwoods and conifers, often in mixed woodlands.

== Taxonomy ==
A. augusta is a species of agaric fungus in the family Amanitaceae. Found in the Pacific Northwest region of North America, it was initially referred to as Amanita franchetti (Boudier 1881) and later Amanita aspera (Thiers 1982, Arora 1986), but it was suspected of being a distinct species. It was formally described as Amanita augusta in 2013.

== Description ==
The cap of A. augusta ranges from 4–12 centimetres (1 1/2–4 1/2 inches) across with a plano-convex curve. The surface of the cap is smooth and ranges in various shades of brown. The surface also contains scattered yellow to brown colored warts formed from the remains of the universal veil. The flesh of the mushroom is soft and tends to be white to light yellow. The lamellae consist of close, white gills that are free or mildly attached to the upper stipe. The stipe ranges from 5–15 cm long and 1–2 cm thick. Most stipes contain a partial veil that resembles a secondary, smaller ring, the same color as the cap. The surface of the stipe is white and scattered with occasional scales. Yellow to gray warts are remnants of the universal veil on the basal bulb. The spores are elliptical, ranging from 8x12 - 6x8 μm, and amyloid. Clamps are not present at the base of basidia. Like many other mushrooms of the Amanita genus, A. augusta contains a white spore print.

== Distribution and habitat ==
Amanita augusta is mycorrhizal with a range of trees in mixed woodlands. Usually found in small groups or alone. This mushroom is most commonly found in Northern and Central California. The fungus is also found along the Pacific Northwest and has been seen in Montana and Idaho.

== Ecology ==
This species forms ectomycorrhizal associations with conifers and a variety of other hardwoods, such as oak, spruce, and Pinus species. This species showed a poor survival rate and is a very slow recolonizer post-controlled burn of host trees. When the fungi reappear and grow mycorrhizae, they form small communities rather than grow in a large group. Two of the most established hosts of A. augusta are P. muricata and Ps. menziesii.

== Toxicity ==
Amanita augusta is classified as a non-edible fungus. This mushroom is known to be an accumulator of heavy metals such as zinc, copper, lead, and others found in soil. The metals are mostly found in the cap and accumulate in the sporocarps, but the stipe also contains the heavy metals. Many of the wild A. augusta contain levels of heavy metals above the threshold for safe human consumption. This mushroom's ability to accumulate heavy metals more effectively than others is most likely attributed to the ectomycorrhizal associations, which allow it to be more efficient in the uptake of metals. One of the most common metals found in this mushroom is zinc.

== Uses ==
Amanita augusta was found to have strong anti-proliferative activity and could be a potential source for drug discovery. Toxicity testing would need to be done on the mushroom in order to ensure that the medicinal properties are not negated by harmful side effects. Along with being a strong anti-proliferative, this species is also shown to be anti-inflammatory and immunostimulatory as well, meaning there may be many possible opportunities for drugs.

== See also ==
- List of Amanita species
