= Lucien Quélet =

French mycologist and naturalist (1832–1899)

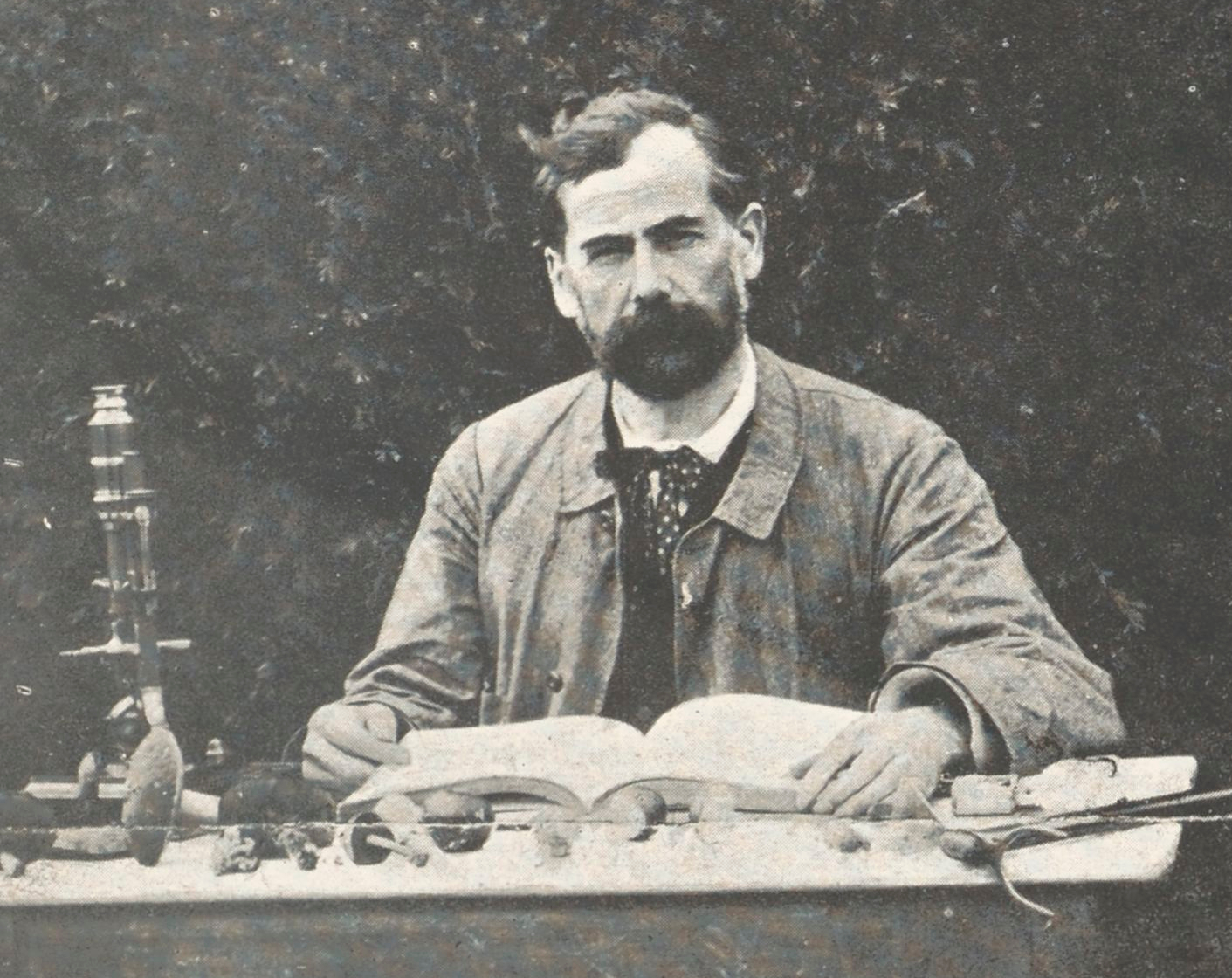
- Lucien Quélet in 1869
- Born: July 14, 1832; Montécheroux, Doubs, France
- Died: August 25, 1899 (aged 67)
- Scientific career
- Fields: Botany; mycology
- Author abbrev. (botany): Quél.

Lucien Quélet (French pronunciation: [lysjɛ̃ kelɛ]; 14 July 1832 – 25 August 1899) was a French naturalist and mycologist. Quélet discovered several species of fungi and was the founder of the Société mycologique de France, a society devoted to mycological studies.

== Biography ==
Quélet, having been born in Montécheroux, Doubs, to a farmer, was soon orphaned, and spent his childhood with and was raised by his aunts. In his youth, he is known to have shown a great interest in mycology and botany in general, but also other subject areas such as ornithology and malacology, the study of mollusks. He was schooled at the college of Montbéliard, and later studied medicine in Strasbourg.

In 1884, he founded the mycological society known as the Société mycologique de France, of which he became the first president. Several years after this, in 1888, Quélet wrote a book, Flore mycologique de la France et des pays limitrophes (Mycological flora of France and neighbouring countries).

During the last years of his life, Quélet broadened his range of study, perhaps due to eccentricity, as is claimed by some, and began to have new interests in some of the things that fascinated him as a youth – ornithology and malacology, among others. At the age of sixty-seven, Lucien Quélet died in 1899.

== Legacy ==
Quélet has been described to be a combination of Petter Adolf Karsten and Paul Kummer, as far as his conducting of his studies and on his mycological researching skills, as well as by the number of new species he was able to find. Much of Quélet's work proves useful still today, and many of the names given to some of the most common fungi can be traced to Quélet's work.

Numerous taxa were named after Quélet to honor his contributions to mycology, including the species Amanita queletii, Boletus queletii, Entoloma queletii, Russula queletii, and the genus Queletia.

Quélet also described several species during his mycological research, such as;

- Agaricus bitorquis
- Amanita aspera
- Bondarzewia montana
- Clavariadelphus truncatus
- Craterellus tubaeformis
- Collybia cirrhata
- Lepiota aspera
- Lepiota castanea
- Russula amethystina
- Tricholoma pardinum
- Xerocomellus armeniacus
