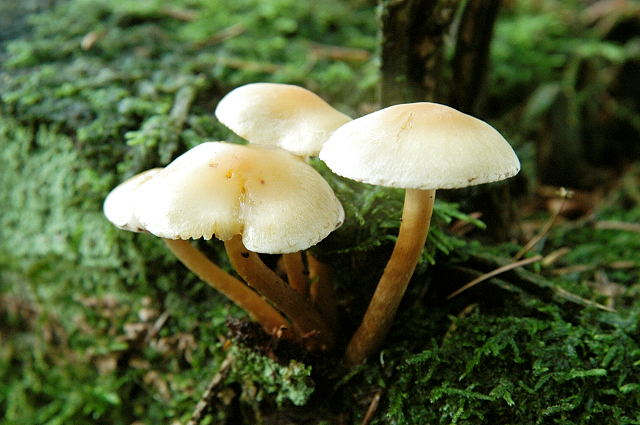
- Gymnopus dryophilus

Scientific classification
- Kingdom: Fungi
- Division: Basidiomycota
- Class: Agaricomycetes
- Order: Agaricales
- Family: Omphalotaceae
- Genus: Gymnopus (Pers.) Gray (1821)

Type species
- Gymnopus fusipes (Bull.) Gray (1821)

Species
- ~ 300

= Gymnopus =

Genus of fungi

Gymnopus is a genus of fungi in the family Omphalotaceae. Basidiocarps (fruit bodies) are agarics (gilled mushrooms) and are saprotrophic, mostly decomposing leaf litter. The genus has a cosmopolitan distribution and contains about 300 species.

== Taxonomy ==
The name Gymnopus was originally proposed in 1801 by South African born Dutch mycologist Christian Hendrik Persoon as a section of the old genus Agaricus and was later raised to genus level by British naturalist Samuel Frederick Gray. For many years Gymnopus was considered a synonym of Collybia, until a 1997 revision reinstated the genus for a group of species related to the type.

== Description ==
Fruit bodies are agaricoid with small to medium-sized caps and a central stem without a ring. Some have a distinct smell like rotten cabbage or garlic. Their spore deposit is white. With one known exception (Gymnopus subnudus), the mating patterns of Gymnopus all seem to be bifactorial, meaning that there is more than one locus responsible for regulating mating compatibility.

== Habitat ==
Gymnopus species are saprotrophic, typically found in woodland decomposing fallen leaves and woody litter.

== Representative species ==
- Gymnopus dryophilus
- Gymnopus fusipes
