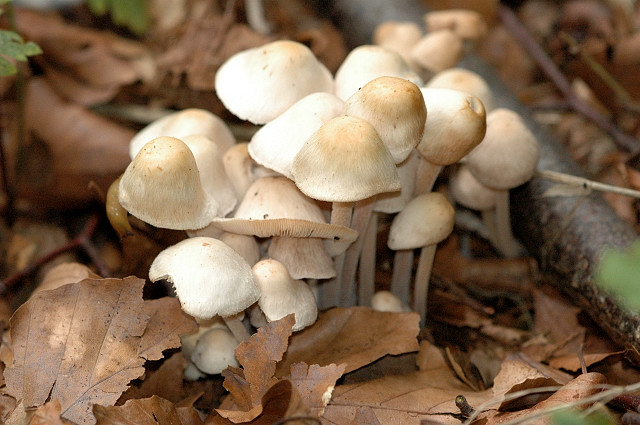

Scientific classification
- Kingdom: Fungi
- Division: Basidiomycota
- Class: Agaricomycetes
- Order: Agaricales
- Family: Omphalotaceae
- Genus: Collybiopsis
- Species: C. confluens

Binomial name
- Collybiopsis confluens (Pers.) R. H. Petersen

Synonyms
- Marasmiellus confluens; Gymnopus confluens; Collybia confluens; Marasmius archyropus; Agaricus confluens

= Collybiopsis confluens =

Clustered toughshank

Species of fungus

Collybiopsis confluens
- Mycological characteristics
- Gills on hymenium
- Cap is convex or flat
- Hymenium is adnate or free
- Stipe is bare
- Spore print is yellow to white
- Ecology is saprotrophic
- Edibility is unknown or inedible

Collybiopsis confluens, commonly known as the clustered toughshank, is a type of mushroom from the Omphalotaceae family. The fruiting body appears from summer until autumn in deciduous and coniferous forests. Collybiopsis confluens is not an edible mushroom.

== Taxonomy ==
The mushroom was first classified as Agaricus confluens by Christian Hendrik Persoon in 1796. In 1828, Persoon re-classified this species under the name of Agaricus archyropus. In 1828, Elias Magnus Fries gave the mushroom the name Maramius archyropus and so put it in the genus Marasmius. Indeed, he used also the younger epithet archyropus, although the older epithet confluens through the designation took precedence. This was corrected in 1898 by P. Karsten, who gave the species the name Marasmius confluens and so used the older epithet for the classification into the genus Marasmius.

In 1871, Paul Kummer placed the mushroom as Collybia confluens in the genus Collybia and in 1898 the species was classified as Chamaeceras archyropus by Otto Kuntze in the newly-founded (by Kuntze) genus of Chamaeceras.

For a long time, the species was labelled as Collybia confluens, following Paul Kummer. This name is still in use today. In 1997, V. Antonìn, R. Halling and M. Noordeloos placed the species in the genus Gymnopus. Genetic studies show however, that Collybiopsis confluens is more closely related to Marasmiellus ramealis (type species of the genus Marasmiellus) than Gymnopus fusipes (type species of the genus Gymnopus) and therefore was classified in the genus Marasmiellus.

In 2021, the Marasmiellus-species, including Marasmiellus ramealis as former type species and Marasmiellus confluens, was transferred to the 1909-established genus Collybiopsis.

=== Etymology ===
The Latin epithet confluens means "to flow together" or "to flow into each other".

== Description ==
=== Macroscopic traits ===
The thin-fleshed cap is 1.5–4 cm (0.59–1.57 in) wide, arched or flattened, and more or less convex. The cap is smooth, matte and faintly ochre or faintly brown depending on humidity. The colours turn pale to a whiteish tone when the cap is dry. Mature fruiting bodies have a wavy and slightly grooved edge.

The lamella are strikingly tightly packed and almost exposed. In early stages, they are whiteish and later turn from a cream to leather-yellow or pink-brownish colour. The spore powder is white.

The stem can be up to 10 cm (3.9 in) long, stiff, hollow, smooth and grooved along its length. It is red-brownish coloured and purple-grey and frosted with fine flakes. The tip of the stem is expanded, resembling a button, at the base of the gills. The base is covered with a white felty mycelium weave. The thin, tough flesh is cream-brownish and gives off a weak, aromatic mushroom scent. Its taste is described as mild.

Amateurs would find it easy to confuse Collybiopsis confluens with other types of mushrooms. Characteristic of this species are the narrow-standing lamellae, the thin-fleshed, reddish-brown and quickly-fading cap and the tough, gristly stem, which is usually noticeably hairy and quite long in relation to the diameter of the cap. The tufted growth is also typical for this species.

=== Microscopic traits ===
The smooth, inamyloid spores are 7–10 μm long and 3.5–4.2 (–5) μm wide. They are slightly tear-shaped, ellipsoid or spindle shaped. They are not cyanophilic, meaning that they cannot be dyed with methyl blue. The club-shaped, basidia containing four spores are 22.4–26.6 μm × 5–7 μm big. Pleurocystidia are absent, but there are many 27.5–70 μm long and 2.8–5.6 μm wide cheilocystidia. They are unevenly club- or cylinder-shaped and twisting. In some instances, they can be unevenly battered or branched like coral. The inamyloid Lamellartrama is parallel to interwoven. The hypha are 3.5–7.8 (–14.8) μm wide, smooth, thin-walled and translucent. They partially contain strongly refractive lipid droplets. The Huttrama is inamyloid and loosely interwoven. The Hyphen are 5.5–13.2 μm wide. The skin of the cap (Pileipellis) is only slightly differentiated and consists of crawling, branched, and radially orientated hyphen. The hyaline and thin walled cells are 2.8–7 μm wide and mostly smooth. Occasionally, they can be spirally and unevenly encrusted by a fine, faint yellow-brown pigment. Clamp connections are present in all tissues.

Gymnopus peronatus can be similar. This also has lamella far apart from each other, yellow lamella when the mushroom is young, light brown lamellae when the mushroom is old, tastes burning hot and grows fewer tufts.

== Distribution ==
Collybiopsis confluens is widely spread throughout Pakistan and the Holarctic realm. In the Holoartic realm, the distribution area reaches from the meridian to the subarctic climate zone. The species has been documented in North Asia (Caucasus, Eastern Siberia, Kamchatka, China, Korea, Japan), North America (USA, Canada), and Europe. In Europe the mushroom is distributed from Spain in the South to Macedonia in the South-East. In western Europe they can be found in France, Great Britain, in the Benelux countries and northwards to the Hebrides. They appear throughout all of middle Europe, east Europe, Ukraine, Belarus and Russia. They can also be found throughout all of Fennoscandia. In the north, its distribution area reaches Sweden and Finland, to beyond the arctic circle.

== Ecology ==
This species appears in almost every native forest, as well as in common forest communities. They mainly contain adult copper beeches. The fruiting body appears from July to November mostly in rows of clusters or fairy circles from 1 to 5 meters in diameter. As a substrate, deciduous and coniferous trees serve very well, however they grow most frequently on copper beech wood. The mushrooms appear from lowland to high mountain land.

== Relevance ==
The mushroom is not edible, even though it likely contains no poison. Due to the tough, cartilaginous stalk and the thickness of its flesh, it is hardly used for this purpose.
