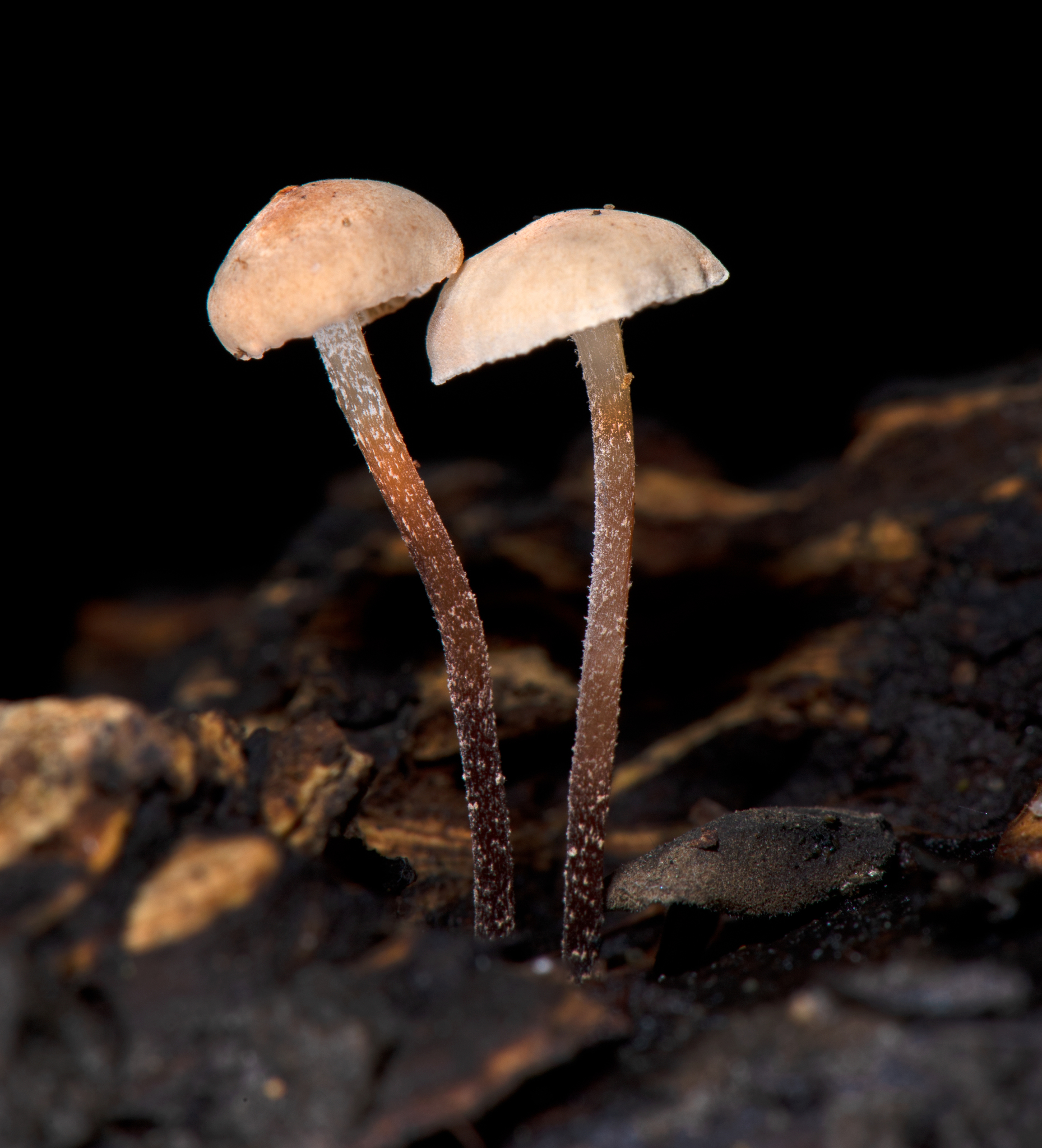

Scientific classification
- Kingdom: Fungi
- Division: Basidiomycota
- Class: Agaricomycetes
- Order: Agaricales
- Family: Omphalotaceae
- Genus: Collybiopsis
- Species: C. californica

Binomial name
- Collybiopsis californica Petersen & Hughes, 2021

Synonyms
- Marasmiellus ramealis var. californicus (Desjardin, 1987)

= Collybiopsis californica =

Species of fungus

Collybiopsis californica is a species of "pinwheel" mushroom found in western North America. C. californica was originally described by Dennis E. Desjardin in 1987 as Marasmiellus ramealis var. californicus. It was moved to genus Collybiopsis and upgraded to full species level in 2021. It was originally known only from southern California but matching DNA has been found as far north as British Columbia.
