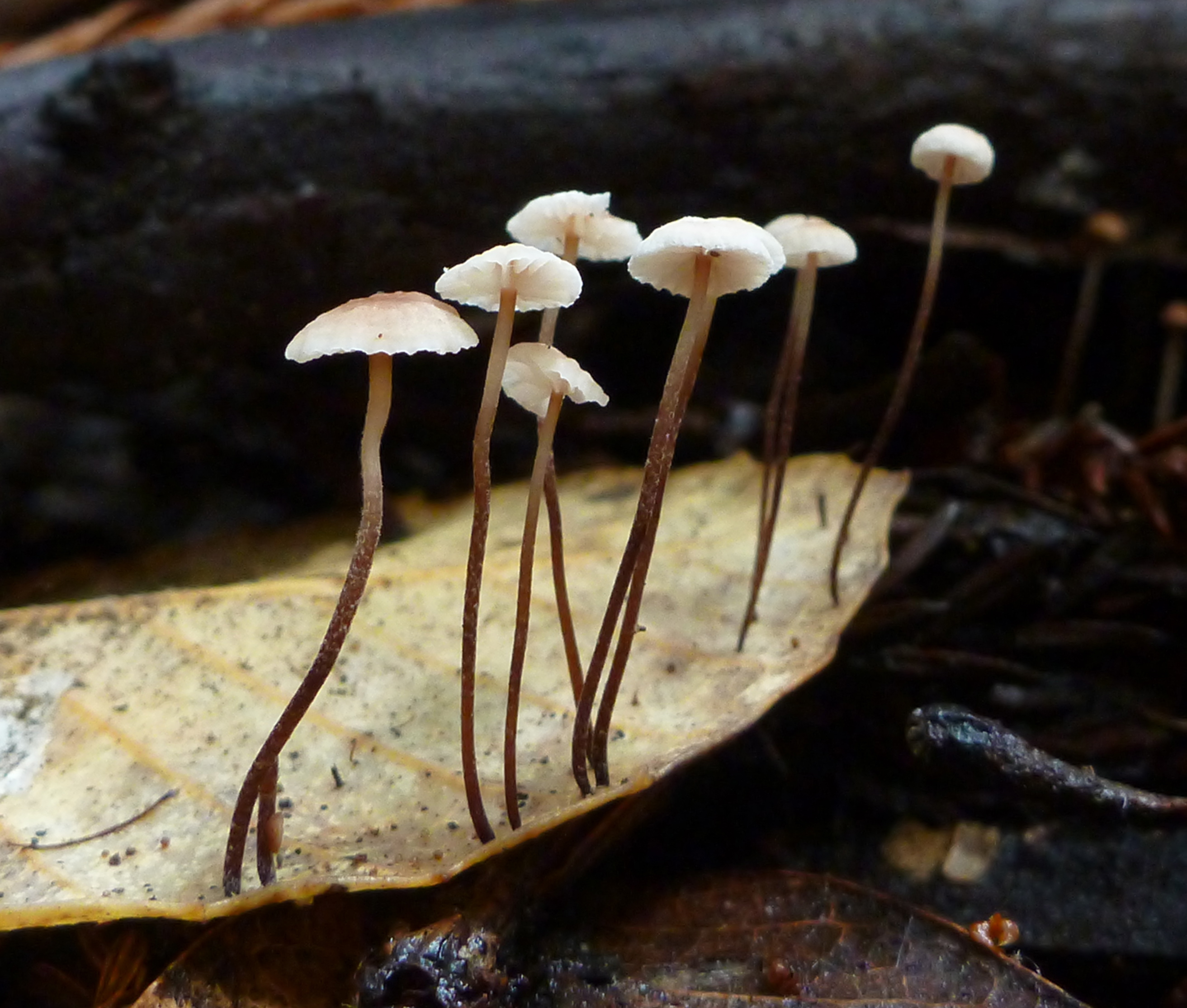
- Collybiopsis quercophila, the oak-leaf pinwheel

Scientific classification
- Kingdom: Fungi
- Division: Basidiomycota
- Class: Agaricomycetes
- Order: Agaricales
- Family: Omphalotaceae
- Genus: Collybiopsis (J.Schröt.) Earle (1909)

Type species
- Collybiopsis ramealis (Bull.) Millsp. (1913)

Synonyms
- Marasmius III Collybiopsis J.Schröt. (1889); Marasmiellus Murrill (1915)

= Collybiopsis =

Genus of pinwheel mushrooms

Collybiopsis is a resurrected genus of mushroom-forming fungi in the family Omphalotaceae.

== Taxonomy ==
Collybiopsis is a genus of fungi in the family Omphalotaceae, order Agaricales. It was established by Franklin Sumner Earle in 1909 with Agaricus ramealis as the type species. The genus encompasses a large clade of non-typical Gymnopus species and includes elements previously classified under Gymnopus, Marasmius, and Marasmiellus. While some researchers have used the name Marasmiellus for this group, Collybiopsis has nomenclatural priority. The Collybiopsis ramealis complex has been shown to be genetically diverse. Molecular phylogenetics studies have led to the reclassification of numerous tax within this genus. As of 2024, several new species have been proposed within Collybiopsis. Some mycologists argue that the genus Collybiopsis may not encompass all species currently classified under Marasmiellus. As a result, they advocate for continued use of Singer's concept of Marasmiellus until the taxonomic relationships are more definitively resolved.

== Description ==
Species of Collybiopsis have a diverse range of fruiting body forms, including shapes reminiscent of the genera Collybia, Gymnopus, Marasmiellus, Omphalina, and Pleurotus. Their gills may be free or extend down the stipe (decurrent). The stipe can be centrally or eccentrically positioned and may grow directly from the substrate (insititious) or have a slightly wider base (subinsititious). Microscopically, Collybiopsis is characterised by ellipsoid to oblong spores that are transparent (hyaline) and do not react with iodine stain (inamyloid). These spores produce white spore prints. The stipe surface features specialised cells called caulocystidia. The cap's outer layer (pileipellis) is distinguished by coral-like or branching (diverticulate) structures at the tips of its fungal filaments.

== Species ==
As of October 2024, Species Fungorum (in the Catalogue of Life) accept 60 species of Collybiopsis.

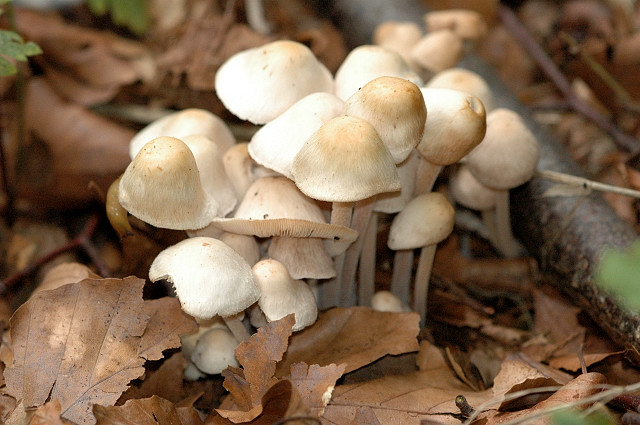
Collybiopsis confluens

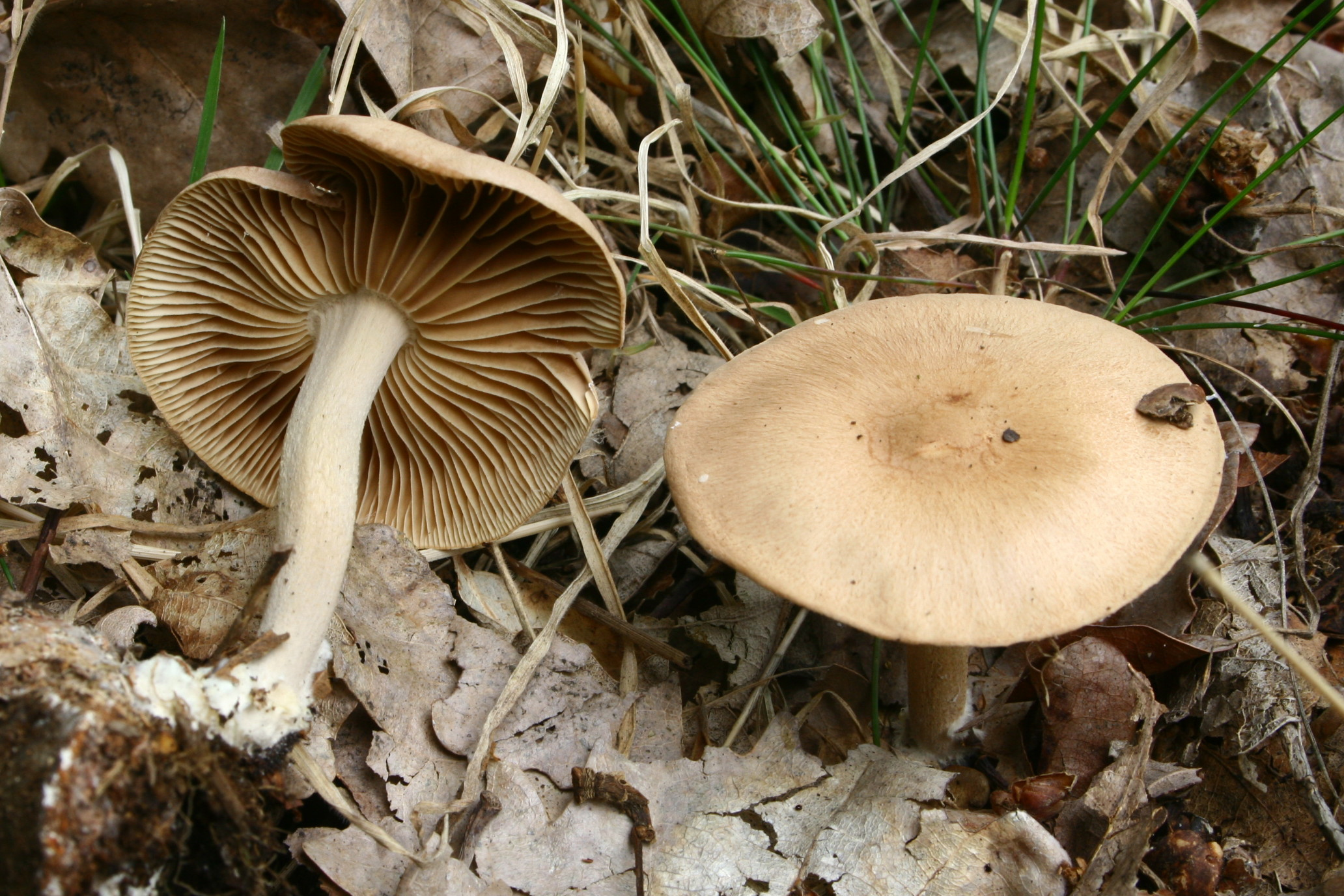
Collybiopsis peronata

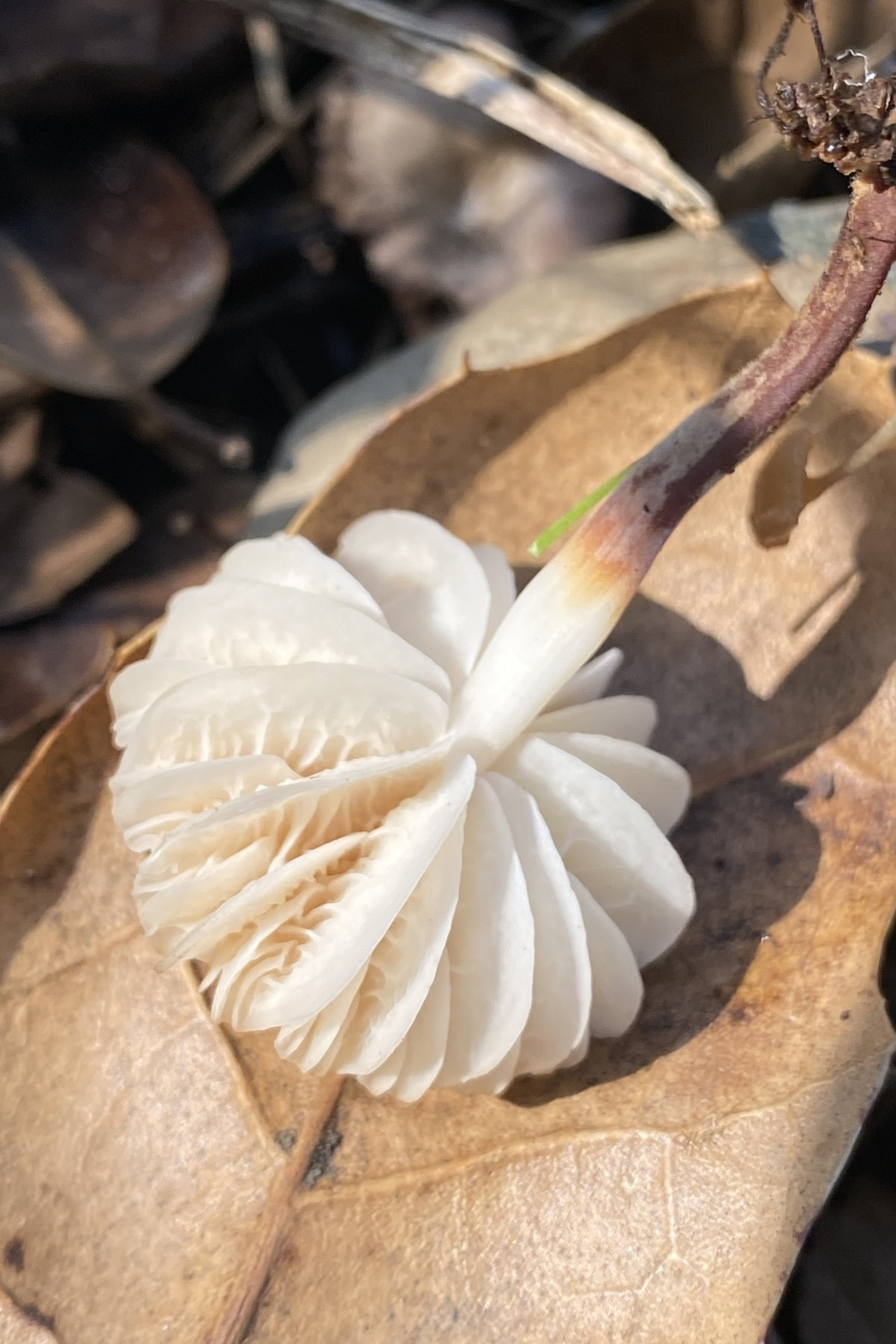
Collybiopsis californica

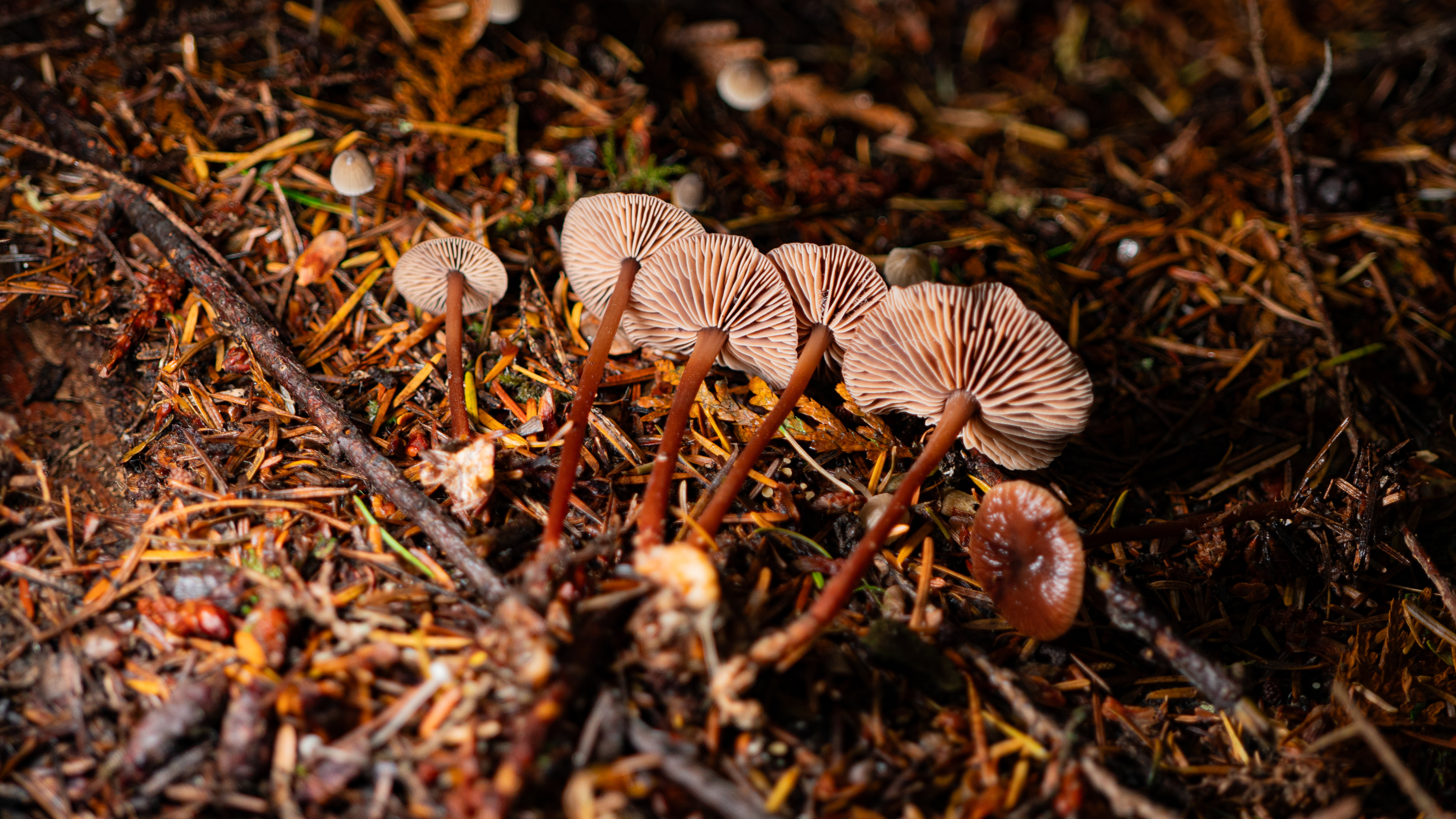
Collybiopsis villosipes

- Collybiopsis affixa (Berk.) J.A.Cooper (2023)
- Collybiopsis albicantipes J.S.Kim & Y.W.Lim (2022) – South Korea
- Collybiopsis alpina J.P.Li, Chang Tian Li & Y.Li (2024)
- Collybiopsis aurantiobasalis (Desjardin & E.Horak) J.A.Cooper (2023)
- Collybiopsis bambusicola Q.Y.Zhang, J.Si & H.J.Li (2023)
- Collybiopsis biformis (Peck) R.H.Petersen (2021)
- Collybiopsis billbowesii J.P.Li & Chang Tian Li (2024)
- Collybiopsis boreoorientalis (Kiyashko) Bartrop & Haelew. (2022)
- Collybiopsis brunneigracilis (Corner) R.H.Petersen (2021)
- Collybiopsis californica (Desjardin) R.H.Petersen (2021)
- Collybiopsis carneopallida (Pouzar) Antonín & Kolařík (2022)
- Collybiopsis cimrmanii Ševčíková & P.-A.Moreau (2022)
- Collybiopsis clavicystidiata J.S.Kim & Y.W.Lim (2022) – South Korea
- Collybiopsis complicata R.H.Petersen (2024) – Tennessee
- Collybiopsis confluens (Pers.) R.H.Petersen (2021)
- Collybiopsis cylindrica (J.L.Mata) J.P.Li, J.S.Oliveira, Antonín & Chang Tian Li (2024)
- Collybiopsis diaphana (César, Bandala & Montoya) J.P.Li, Antonín, J.S.Oliveira & Chang Tian Li (2024)
- Collybiopsis dichroa (Berk. & M.A.Curtis) R.H.Petersen (2021)
- Collybiopsis diminuta (Berk. & Broome) R.H.Petersen (2021)
- Collybiopsis disjuncta (R.H.Petersen & K.W.Hughes) R.H.Petersen & K.W.Hughes (2021)
- Collybiopsis eneficola (R.H.Petersen) R.H.Petersen (2021)
- Collybiopsis fibrosipes (Berk. & M.A.Curtis) R.H.Petersen (2021)
- Collybiopsis filamentipes R.H.Petersen (2021)
- Collybiopsis foliiphila (A.K.Dutta, K.Acharya & Antonín) R.H.Petersen (2021)
- Collybiopsis fulva J.S.Kim & Y.W.Lim (2022) – South Korea
- Collybiopsis furtiva R.H.Petersen (2021)
- Collybiopsis gibbosa (Corner) R.H.Petersen (2021)
- Collybiopsis hasanskyensis R.H.Petersen (2021)
- Collybiopsis hirtelloides (Desjardin & B.A.Perry) J.P.Li, Antonín, J.S.Oliveira & Chang Tian Li (2024)
- Collybiopsis indocta (Corner) R.H.Petersen (2021)
- Collybiopsis istanbulensis (E.Sesli, Antonín & K.W. Hughes) J.S.Kim & Y.W.Lim (2022)
- Collybiopsis juniperina (Murrill) R.H.Petersen (2021)
- Collybiopsis koreana (Antonín, Ryoo & H.D.Shin) J.S.Kim & Y.W.Lim (2022)
- Collybiopsis longistipes (Muh. Ali, Niazi & Khalid) Bartrop & Haelew. (2022)
- Collybiopsis luxurians (Peck) R.H.Petersen (2021)
- Collybiopsis melanopus (A.W.Wilson, Desjardin & E.Horak) R.H.Petersen (2021)
- Collybiopsis menehune (Desjardin, Halling & Hemmes) R.H.Petersen (2021)
- Collybiopsis mesoamericana (J.L.Mata) R.H.Petersen (2021)
- Collybiopsis micromphaloides (R.H.Petersen & K.W.Hughes) R.H.Petersen (2021)
- Collybiopsis micromphaloides (R.H.Petersen & K.W.Hughes) R.H.Petersen (2021)
- Collybiopsis minor R.H.Petersen (2021)
- Collybiopsis mustachia (Desjardin & B.A.Perry) J.P.Li & Chang Tian Li (2024)
- Collybiopsis neotropica (Corner) R.H.Petersen (2021)
- Collybiopsis nonnulla (Corner) R.H.Petersen (2021)
- Collybiopsis obscuroides (Antonín & Legon) R.H.Petersen (2021)
- Collybiopsis ocella (Desjardin & B.A.Perry) J.P.Li, Antonín, J.S.Oliveira & Chang Tian Li (2024)
- Collybiopsis omphalodes (Berk.) J.S.Kim & Y.W.Lim (2022)
- Collybiopsis orientisubnuda J.S.Kim & Y.W.Lim (2022) – South Korea
- Collybiopsis pakistanica F.Razzaq, Khalid & S.Ashraf (2023)
- Collybiopsis parvula (J.L.Mata, R.H.Petersen & K.W. Hughes) R.H.Petersen (2021)
- Collybiopsis peronata (Bolton) R.H.Petersen (2021)
- Collybiopsis polygramma (Mont.) R.H.Petersen (2021)
- Collybiopsis prolapsis R.H.Petersen & K.W.Hughes (2024) – Georgia
- Collybiopsis pseudolodgeae (J.L.Mata) J.P.Li & Chang Tian Li (2024)
- Collybiopsis pseudoluxurians (R.H.Petersen & K.W.Hughes) R.H.Petersen (2021)
- Collybiopsis pseudomphalodes (Dennis) J.S.Kim & Y.W.Lim (2022)
- Collybiopsis quercophila (Pouzar) R.H.Petersen (2021)
- Collybiopsis ramealis (Bull.) Millsp. (1913)
- Collybiopsis ramulicola (T.H.Li & S.F.Deng) J.S.Kim & Y.W.Lim (2022)
- Collybiopsis readiae (G.Stev.) R.H.Petersen (2021)
- Collybiopsis rimutaka (G.Stev.) E.Horak (1971)
- Collybiopsis rodhallii (Desjardin & B.A.Perry) Bartrop & Haelew. (2022)
- Collybiopsis schizophylloides J.P.Li, Chang Tian Li & Y.Li (2024)
- Collybiopsis stenophylla (Mont.) R.H.Petersen (2021)
- Collybiopsis subcyathiformis (Murrill) R.H.Petersen (2021)
- Collybiopsis subnuda (Ellis ex Peck) R.H.Petersen (2022)
- Collybiopsis subpruinosa (Murrill) R.H.Petersen (2021)
- Collybiopsis subumbilicata J.S.Kim & Y.W.Lim (2022) – South Korea
- Collybiopsis synodica (Kunze ex Fr.) R.H.Petersen (2021)
- Collybiopsis termiticola (Corner) R.H.Petersen (2021)
- Collybiopsis trogioides (A.W.Wilson, Desjardin & E.Horak) J.P.Li, J.S.Oliveira, Antonín & Chang Tian Li (2024)
- Collybiopsis undulata J.S.Kim & Y.W.Lim (2022) – South Korea
- Collybiopsis vaillantii (Pers.) R.H.Petersen (2021)
- Collybiopsis vellerea J.S.Kim & Y.W.Lim (2022) – South Korea
- Collybiopsis villosipes (Cleland) R.H.Petersen (2021)
