= Collybiopsis affixa =

Scientific classification
- Kingdom: Fungi
- Division: Basidiomycota
- Class: Agaricomycetes
- Order: Agaricales
- Family: Omphalotaceae
- Genus: Collybiopsis
- Species: C. affixa

Binomial name
- Collybiopsis affixa (Berk.) J.A.Cooper (2023)

Synonyms
- List: Agaricus affixus Berk. (1848); Marasmius affixus (Berk.) Berk. (1859); Pleurotus affixus (Berk.) Sacc. (1887); Chamaeceras affixus (Berk.) Kuntze (1898); Dendrosarcus affixus (Berk.) Kuntze (1898); Marasmiellus affixus (Berk.) Singer (1973)

Species of lichen

Collybiopsis affixa, the little stinker, is a species of fungus in the family Omphalotaceae. It occurs in Asia and Australia. While it has been considered a basidiolichen by some researchers, its status as a lichenised fungus remains uncertain.

== Taxonomy ==
It was described as a new species in 1848 by Miles Joseph Berkeley, who initially classified it in the genus Agaricus. The type was collected in 1846 by Ronald Campbell Gunn from Penquite at Launceston, Tasmania, where it was growing on the bark on a young Eucalyptus amygdalina tree. The taxon has been shuffled to several genera in its taxonomic history, including Marasmius, Pleurotus, and the now-superseded genus names Chamaeceras, and Dendrosarcus. In more recent history, Rolf Singer transferred it to Marasmiellus in 1973, and it has been generally known by that name for about five decades. Following a molecular phylogenetics-led resurrection and restructuring of Collybiopsis, Jerry Cooper transferred it to this genus in 2023.

It is colloquially known as the "little stinker" due to its characteristic odour, described as resembling "strong rotting cabbage" or "old-wet-nappy".

== Description ==
The thallus of this basidiolichen comprises a thin greenish-coloured film from which mushroom-shaped fruiting bodies arise. These structures are up to about 10 mm in diameter and have a buff to pinkish-buff cap and a short stipe. The thallus has a distinct odour or rotting cabbage or stale urine, which persists even if fruiting bodies are not present.

== Lichen status ==
The classification of C. affixa as a basidiolichen has been a subject of debate. In 1970, Rolf Singer first suggested that this species was lichenised, noting its association with a crustose lichen on Eucalyptus saplings in Australia. Singer later provided more detailed observations in 1973, describing a crustose organism consisting of Coccomyxa algal cells embedded in basidiomycete hyphae, which produced fruiting bodies identified as Marasmiellus affixus (now C. affixa).

Singer's observations suggested a possible lichenised state, noting variability in the association between fungal hyphae and algal cells. He observed that in some areas, algal accumulations contained few mycelial threads, while in others, the mycelium was so dense that it completely covered the algal cells. However, these observations have not been conclusively confirmed by subsequent studies. The fungus-algal connection was not examined in detail, and the presence of algal cells in the fruiting body trama is not considered definitive evidence of lichenisation, as foreign bodies can occasionally appear in fungal fruiting bodies. As of 2011, the lichenisation of C. affixa was considered plausible but not proven. The species was not included in more recent molecular analyses of basidiolichens, leaving its status uncertain.

== Habitat and distribution ==
In Tasmania (Australia), Collybiopsis affixa grows in sclerophyll forest, on dead woody material, especially that which has lost its bark. It has also been recorded in cool-temperate rainforest habitats growing on dead Dicksonia antarctica fronds. Its Australian distribution also includes Queensland, South Australia, and Victoria. The basidiolichen has also been reported from India, and from North Sumatra (Indonesia). A local name used by the Dayak ethnic group to refer to the basidiolichen is kulat kerang, which translates to "shell mushroom" or "shell fungus".
