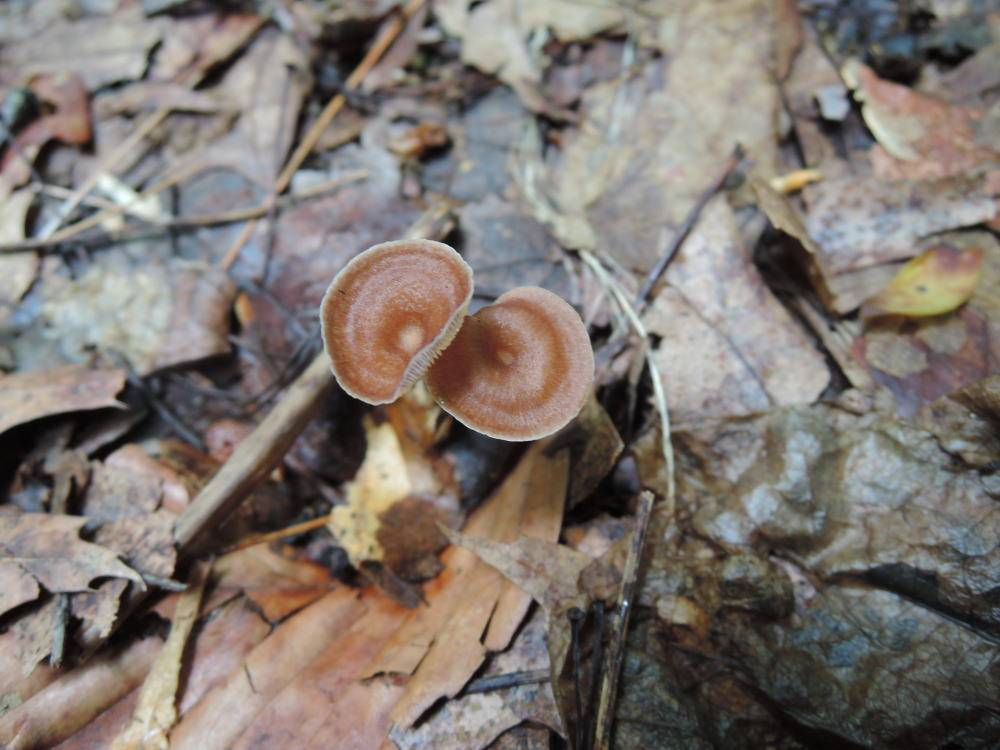

Scientific classification
- Domain: Eukaryota
- Kingdom: Fungi
- Division: Basidiomycota
- Class: Agaricomycetes
- Order: Agaricales
- Family: Omphalotaceae
- Genus: Collybiopsis
- Species: C. biformis

Binomial name
- Collybiopsis biformis (Peck) R.H. Petersen (2021)

Synonyms
- Marasmius biformis Peck (1903); Collybia biformis (Peck) Singer (1962); Gymnopus biformis (Peck) Halling (1997)

= Collybiopsis biformis =

Species of fungus

Collybiopsis biformis is a species of agaric fungus in the family Omphalotaceae found in North America. The species was originally described by Charles Horton Peck in 1903 as Marasmius biformis. The specific epithet biformis refers to the two distinct cap shapes, which Peck noted could be either campanulate (bell-shaped) or flattened. R.H. Petersen transferred the fungus to the genus Collybiopsis in 2021.
