= Marasmiellus hapuuarum =

Scientific classification
- Domain: Eukaryota
- Kingdom: Fungi
- Division: Basidiomycota
- Class: Agaricomycetes
- Order: Agaricales
- Family: Omphalotaceae
- Genus: Marasmiellus
- Species: M. hapuuarum

Binomial name
- Marasmiellus hapuuarum Desjardin & Hemmes (2011)
- Known only from Hawaii

Species of fungus

Marasmiellus hapuuarum is a species of agaric fungus in the family Marasmiaceae. Formally described in 2011, it is known only from Hawaiian montane wet forests where it grows on aging hāpuʻu plants. The fungus produces small pinkish-buff fruit bodies up to 0.6 cm (0.24 in) in diameter, with distantly spaced narrow gills.

== Taxonomy ==
The species was first formally described by mycologists Dennis Desjardin and Don Hemmes in 2011 in Mycologia. It had previously appeared in the literature under the provisional name Marasmiellus hapuuae in their 2002 book Mushrooms of Hawaii. The holotype material was collected by Desjardin in January, 1996 in the Kamakou Forest Preserve on Molokaʻi island. The specific epithet hapuuarum refers to the name of the hāpuʻu tree fern upon which the fungus grows.

== Description ==
The cap is initially convex before flattening in age, reaching diameters of 0.2–0.6 cm (0.08–0.24 in). The cap surface is dry, dull, grooved to wrinkled/grooved, and has a felt- to suede-like texture. The color ranges from buff to pale orange white or pinkish buff, although the color can fade to nearly white in maturity. The flesh in thin—less than 1 mm—and buff-colored. The gills are distantly spaced, with 1 or 2 series of lamellulae interspersed between 4 and 8 gills. The stem is initially centrally placed, but as it ages becomes eccentric to almost laterally attached. It is cylindrical, more or less equal in width through its length, and pruinose (with a fine whitish powder on its surface), measuring 1–2 mm long by 0.1–0.2 mm thick. The base of the stem has a small disk of cream-colored mycelium. Fruit bodies have no distinctive taste or odor.

The spore print is white. The thin-walled spores are ellipsoid with a prominent hilum, smooth, hyaline (translucent), and measure 8–10 by 4.2–4.8 μm. The basidia (spore-bearing cells) are club-shaped, hyaline, clamped, and are attached to anywhere from one to four spores; they measure 20–24 by 7–8 μm.

== Habitat and distribution ==
Marasmiellus hapuuarum is endemic to Hawaii, on the islands of Hawaiʻi, Maui, and Molokaʻi. It grows scattered or in groups on aging rachises (the main shaft of a fern frond) and pinnae (leaflets) of the tropical tree fern species Cibotium, which are endemic to montane wet forests.
