= Marasmiellus scandens =

Scientific classification
- Kingdom: Fungi
- Division: Basidiomycota
- Class: Agaricomycetes
- Order: Agaricales
- Family: Omphalotaceae
- Genus: Marasmiellus
- Species: M. scandens

Binomial name
- Marasmiellus scandens (Massee) Dennis & D.A. Reid, (1957)

Synonyms
- Marasmius byssicola Petch, (1928); Marasmius scandens Massee

Species of fungus

Marasmiellus scandens is a plant pathogen that causes white thread on cocoa.
