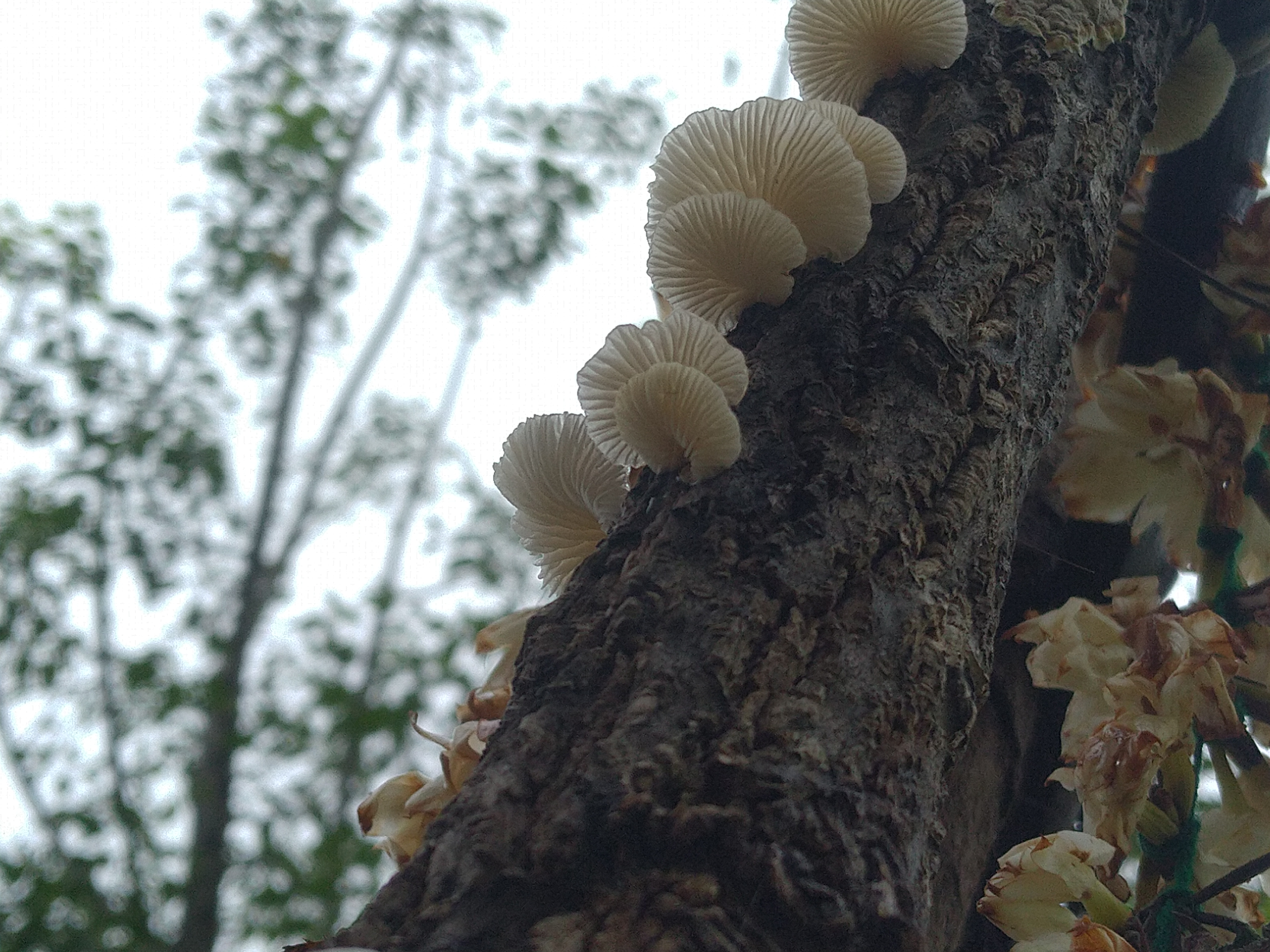
- Basidiocarps of Marasmiellus inoderma on a banana pseudostem

Scientific classification
- Domain: Eukaryota
- Kingdom: Fungi
- Division: Basidiomycota
- Class: Agaricomycetes
- Order: Agaricales
- Family: Omphalotaceae
- Genus: Marasmiellus
- Species: M. inoderma

Binomial name
- Marasmiellus inoderma (Berk.) Singer (1955)

Synonyms
- Marasmius inoderma Berk. (1851); Chamaeceras inodermus (Berk.) Kuntze (1898)

= Marasmiellus inoderma =

Species of fungus

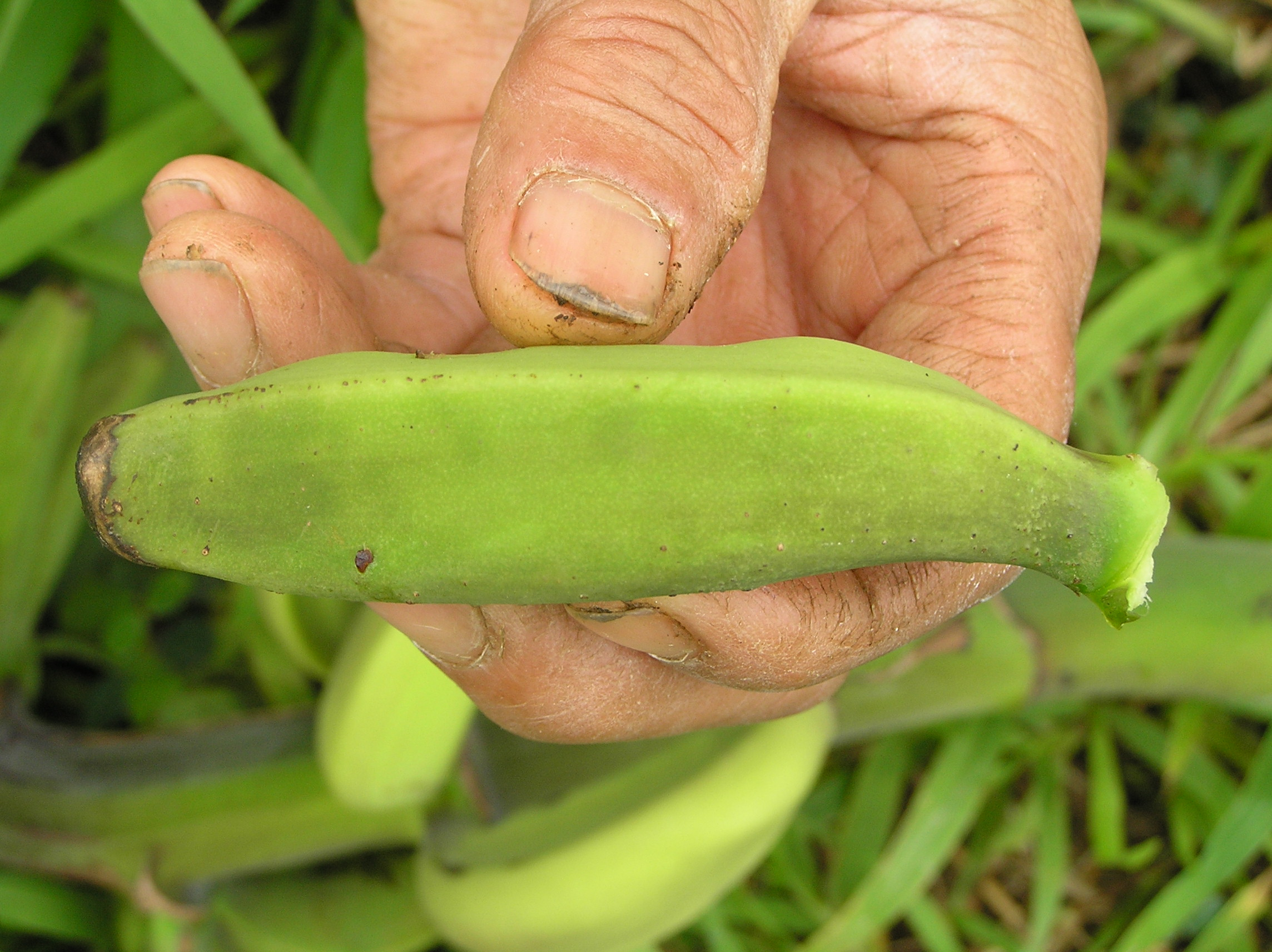
Poor fruit development (lumpy fruits) for ladyfinger banana in Hawaii associated with Marasmiellus stem rot of banana, caused by M. inoderma

Marasmiellus inoderma is a fungus in the family Marasmiaceae. It is a plant pathogen that causes root-rot of maize, Marasmiellus rot on banana and basal rot of golden shower orchid.
