= James Bolton =

English naturalist, botanist, mycologist, and illustrator (1735–1799)

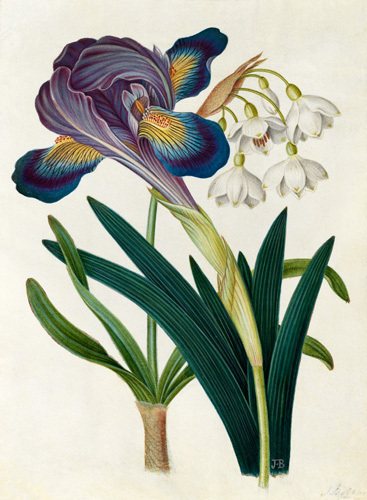
- Iris and Summer Snowdrop by James Bolton. No likeness of James Bolton is known to exist. A published portrait once thought to be of him is actually of a London engraver of the same name.
- Born: 1735; West Field, Warley, West Riding of Yorkshire, England
- Died: 7 January 1799 (aged 63–64); Warley, Yorkshire, England
- Known for: Contributions to the taxonomy of ferns and fungi
- Scientific career
- Fields: Natural history
- Author abbrev. (botany): Bolton

James Bolton (1735 – 7 January 1799) was an English naturalist, botanist, mycologist, and illustrator.

== Background ==
James Bolton was born near Warley in the West Riding of Yorkshire in 1735, the son of William Bolton, a weaver. James initially followed in his father's trade, but later became a self-taught art teacher and finally a publican in his home village of Warley. He married Sarah Blackburn in 1768 and the couple had four children. He and his family lived all their lives in the Halifax area.

James and his older brother, Thomas Bolton (1722–1778), were keen naturalists, Thomas having a particular interest in entomology and ornithology. Edward Donovan named the dragonfly Cordulegaster boltonii after a specimen collected by Thomas Bolton. The two brothers contributed to the natural history section in The History and Antiquities of the Parish of Halifax in Yorkshire, published in 1775 by John Watson. James Bolton subsequently developed his interest further by writing or illustrating a number of important natural history books.

== Ferns and flowering plants ==
In 1785, Bolton provided the illustrations for Richard Relhan's Flora Cantabrigiensis. In the same year, he also published the first of his own works, part one of Filices Britannicae, an illustrated account of British ferns in two volumes. James Bolton not only drew the illustrations, but etched them himself. Moreover, he did not merely collate existing information on ferns, but undertook original research and field work. The book includes a description and illustration of a new fern species, now known as Woodsia alpina (Bolton) Gray. At this time, Bolton was commissioned by the wealthy Margaret Bentinck, Duchess of Portland (1715–1785) to illustrate plants in her museum collection.

James Bolton's additional illustrations of native and exotic flowering plants were never published. A number of his original watercolours, however, are extant, including Fifty Flowers Drawn from Nature at Halifax (1785–1787) at the Natural History Museum, an album from 1794 called "Twelve Posies Gathered in the Fields" held at Liverpool Museum, and a collection of botanical paintings in the Lindley Library at the Royal Horticultural Society.

In 1788 the genus Boltonia (Compositae) was named in his honour by Charles Louis L'Héritier de Brutelle.

== Fungi ==
Bolton's chief interest was in fungi, which he assiduously collected, carried home in his vasculum and illustrated. He also corresponded with many of the notable mycologists of his day, including Jean Bulliard, James Dickson, John Lightfoot, and Carl Willdenow. The result was the publication of the first English-language work devoted to fungi, Bolton's three-volume An History of Fungusses growing about Halifax, published 1788–1790, with a supplement in 1791. The work was dedicated to Henry Noel, 6th Earl of Gainsborough (1743–1798), who was one of Bolton's patrons and helped fund the project. As with the earlier book on ferns, Bolton not only undertook the illustrations, but also did the etchings for the work, which were then hand-coloured. Among the species covered, many were newly described, including such familiar fungi as the Wood Woollyfoot Gymnopus peronatus (Bolton) P. Kumm., the inkcap Coprinellus domesticus (Bolton) Vilgalys et al., the Cramp Ball Daldinia concentrica (Bolton) Ces. & De Not., the bracket Daedaleopsis confragosa (Bolton) J. Schröt., the agaric Lepiota cristata (Bolton) P. Kumm., and the Fairy-Ring Champignon Marasmius oreades (Bolton) Fr. The book was translated into German, as Geschichte der merkwürdigsten Pilze, and published in four volumes (1795–1820) with notes by Willdenow.

An additional album of 233 unpublished paintings of fungi, known as Icones fungorum circa Halifax nascentium, is held in the Special Collections Library of the United States Department of Agriculture. A collection of 36 "fungi illustrations" (c. 1780) is also held at the Natural History Museum and some additional sketches are in the library of the Earl of Derby at Knowsley Hall.

Few of Bolton's fungal collections survive, but some of his specimens are in the mycological herbarium at the Royal Botanic Gardens, Kew and others in the Edward Robson herbarium at Sunderland Museum.

== Songbirds ==
Bolton's final published work was Harmonia ruralis, an "essay towards a natural history of British songbirds", issued in two volumes (1794–6). Birds and their nests were drawn from life, whilst the text contained many of Bolton's first-hand observations. The popularity of the subject matter led to two subsequent but posthumous editions in 1830 and 1845.

== Works ==
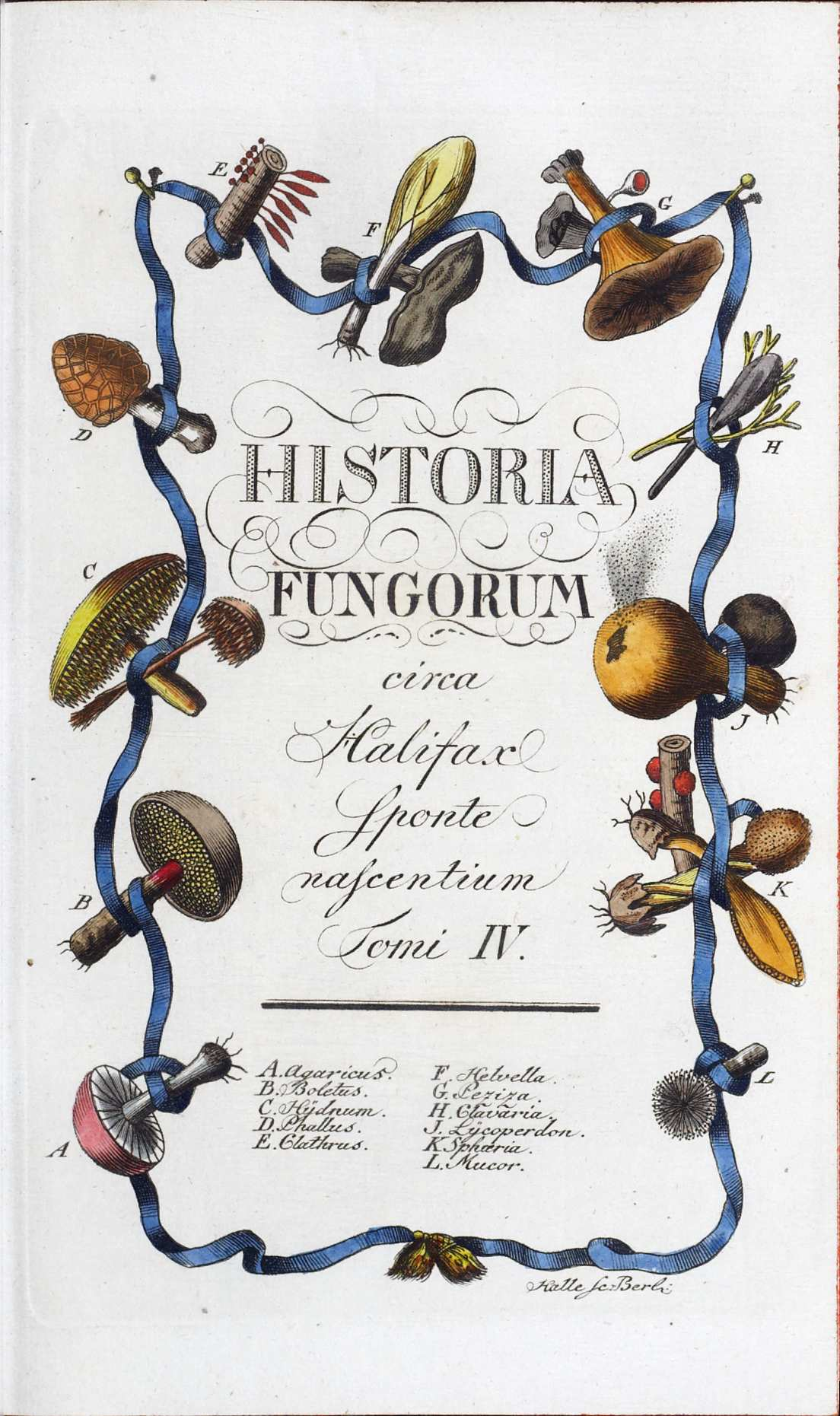
An History of Fungusses (1795 German edition)

- Filices britannicae. Leeds: John Binns. 1785.
- An History of Fungusses, Groving About Halifax, 4 voll., Huddersfield, 1788–1791.
  - Geschichte der merckwurdigsten Pilze [An History of Fungusses, Groving about Halifax] (in German). Vol. 1. Berlin: Pauly. 1795.
  - Geschichte der merckwurdigsten Pilze (in German). Vol. 2. Berlin: Pauly. 1797.
  - Geschichte der merckwurdigsten Pilze (in German). Vol. 3. Berlin: Pauly. 1799.
  - Geschichte der merckwurdigsten Pilze (in German). Vol. 4. Berlin: Pauly. 1820.

== James Bolton today ==
An exhibition devoted to James Bolton and his works was held at the Liverpool Museum in 1995-6 and he was one of the artists featured in the Nature Observed exhibition at the University of London in 2006. Bolton's fern and fungi books, with their descriptions of new species, remain of scientific value today, whilst his bird studies from Harmonia ruralis have retained their attraction – and have been reproduced as prints, on table mats and coasters, and even on tea towels.
