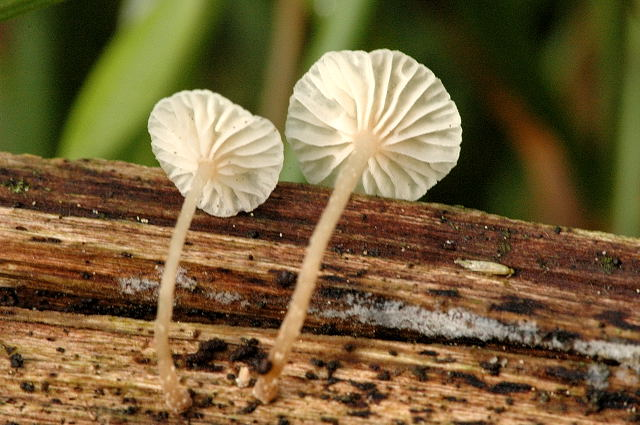

Scientific classification
- Domain: Eukaryota
- Kingdom: Fungi
- Division: Basidiomycota
- Class: Agaricomycetes
- Order: Agaricales
- Family: Omphalotaceae
- Genus: Marasmiellus
- Species: M. ramealis

Binomial name
- Marasmiellus ramealis (Bull.) Singer (1948)

Synonyms
- Agaricus ramealis Bull. (1788)

= Marasmiellus ramealis =

Species of fungus

Marasmiellus ramealis is a species of mushroom-forming fungus of the family Marasmiaceae.
