= Paragymnopus =

- Paragymnopus foliiphilus

Scientific classification
- Kingdom: Fungi
- Division: Basidiomycota
- Class: Agaricomycetes
- Order: Agaricales
- Family: Omphalotaceae
- Genus: Paragymnopus; J.S.Oliveira

Species
- See text.

Genus of fungi

Paragymnopus is a genus of fungi in the family Omphalotaceae. It was described as new to science in 2019, based on DNA analysis of various members of the family Omphalotaceae. As of September 2026, the Catalogue of Life accepts six species.

== Species ==
- Paragymnopus foliiphilus (R.H. Petersen) J.S. Oliveira
- Paragymnopus perforans (Hoffm.) J.S. Oliveira
- Paragymnopus pinophilus (R.H. Petersen) J.S. Oliveira
- Paragymnopus ponderosae (R.H. Petersen) J.S. Oliveira
- Paragymnopus sequoiae (Desjardin) J.S. Oliveira
- Paragymnopus sublaccatus (R.H. Petersen) J.S. Oliveira
