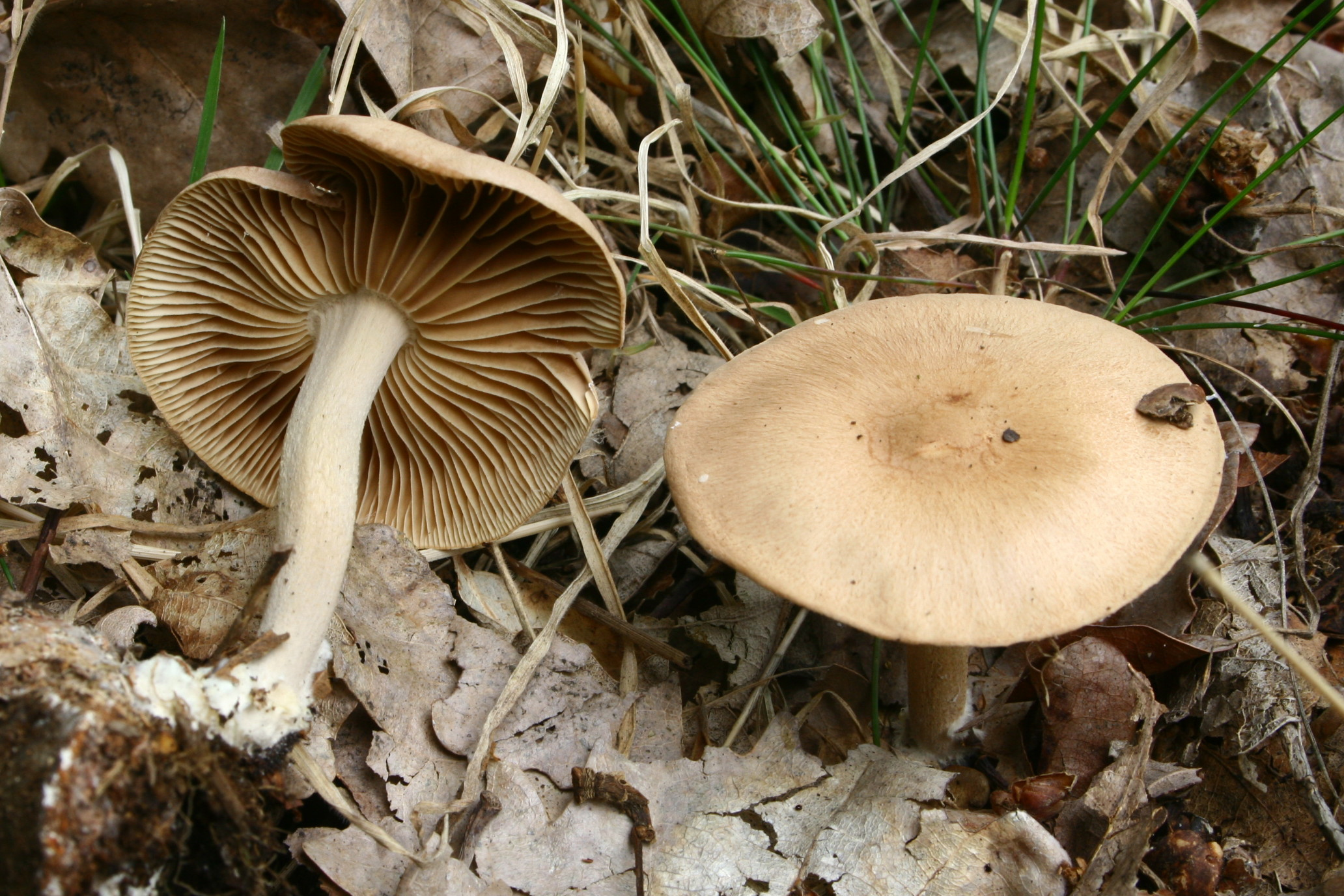

Scientific classification
- Kingdom: Fungi
- Division: Basidiomycota
- Class: Agaricomycetes
- Order: Agaricales
- Family: Omphalotaceae
- Genus: Collybiopsis
- Species: C. peronata

Binomial name
- Collybiopsis peronata (Bolton) R.H. Petersen (2021)

Synonyms
- Gymnopus peronatus (Bolton) Gray (1821); Collybia peronata (Bolton) P. Kumm.; Marasmius urens (Bull.) Fr.

= Collybiopsis peronata =

Species of fungus

Collybiopsis peronata
- Mycological characteristics
- Gills on hymenium
- Cap is convex
- Hymenium is free
- Stipe is bare
- Spore print is white
- Ecology is saprotrophic
- Edibility is not recommended

Collybiopsis peronata, also known as wood woolly-foot, is a species of gilled mushroom which is common in European woods.

== Naming ==
This species was originally described by James Bolton in his 1788 book "An history of fungusses, growing about Halifax" as Agaricus peronatus at a time when all gilled mushrooms were assigned to genus Agaricus. Then in 1821 another Englishman, Samuel Frederick Gray published his "Natural Arrangement of British Plants" (including fungi) in which he allocated the species to the already existing genus Gymnopus.

In 1791 Bulliard described the same species as Agaricus urens, the epithet "urens" ("burning") referring to the acrid taste, and in 1836 Fries put it genus Marasmius. Also in 1871 Paul Kummer put this mushroom in genus Collybia, giving it the name Collybia peronata. For many years it was known either as Marasmius urens or Collybia peronata (or sometimes Marasmius peronatus or Collybia urens). The peronatus and urens forms have been distinguished as different species, urens having a lighter-coloured cap, but this view is outdated.

In much later work culminating in 1997, Antonín and Noordeloos found that the genus Collybia as defined at that time was unsatisfactory due to being polyphyletic and they proposed a fundamental rearrangement. After being placed in a resurrected genus Gymnopus, this species is now accepted as being classified in the genus Collybiopsis.

The species name peronata indicates that the stem is "booted" with a hairy covering below (from the Latin peronatus meaning "rough-booted").

== Description ==
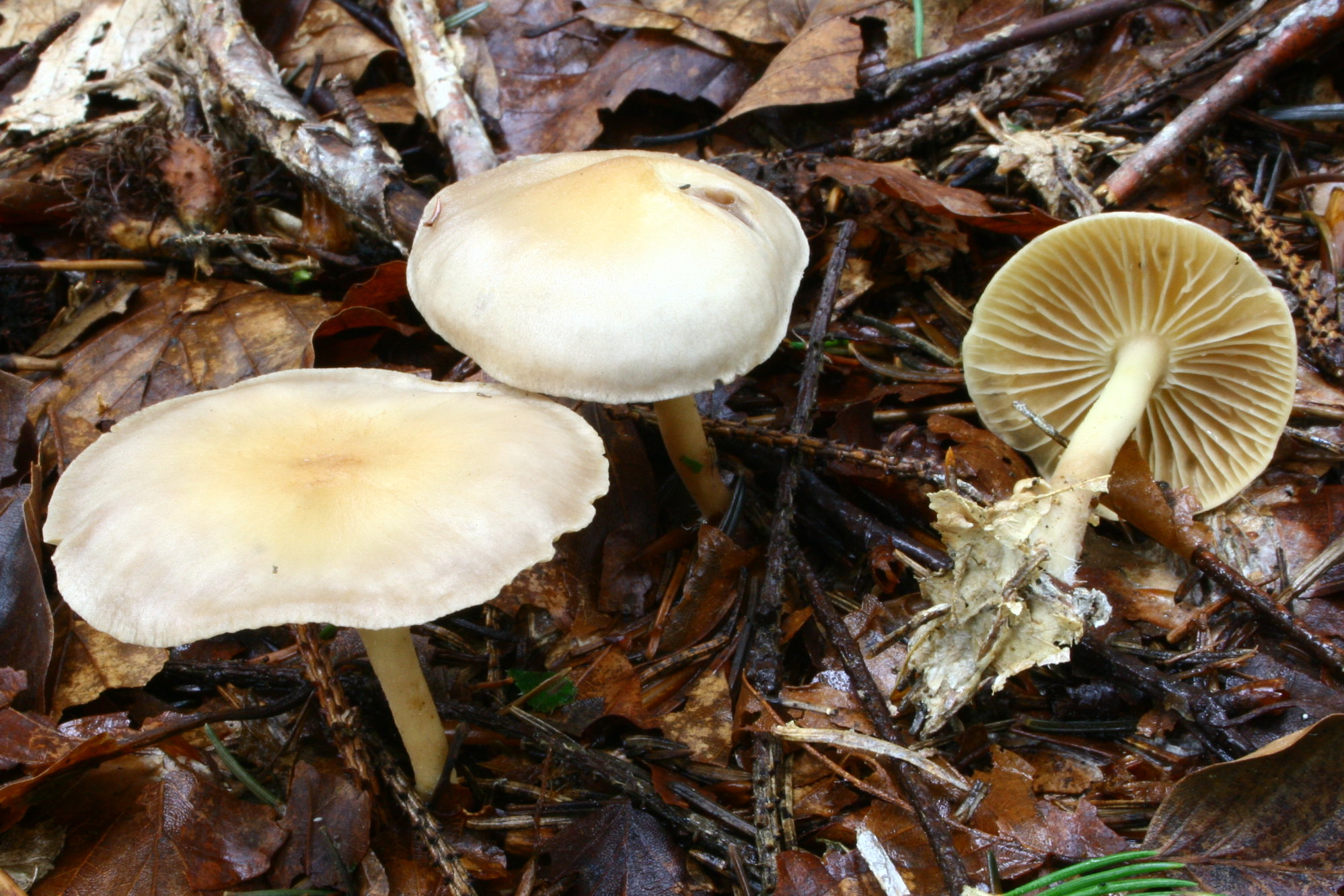
Yellowish specimens

The following sections use the given references throughout.

=== General ===
- The cap grows from about 2 cm to 6 cm, and is yellowish or reddish brown with a small central umbo.
- There is no ring or other veil remnant. The stem is roughly the same colour as the cap (darkening with age) and up to about 8 cm long and 0.5 cm in diameter. It is typically pruinose ('frosted') above and strigose (hairy) near the base, which is larger and connected to a buff mycelium.
- The well-spaced gills are concolorous with the cap or somewhat lighter.
- The undamaged mushroom has little smell, but on bruising it has an aroma of vinegar. The taste is mild then acrid or peppery.

=== Microscopic characteristics ===
- The elongated comma-shaped spores are around 8 μm by 4 μm.
- It has irregular coralloid cheilocystidia.

=== Distribution, habitat & ecology ===
This saprobic mushroom grows generally in smaller or larger clumps on leaves or needles in deciduous or coniferous woods and may be found from May to December.

It is common throughout Europe, and has also been reported from a few sites in America and Japan.

== Edibility ==
This fungus is generally regarded as inedible, mainly because of its peppery or acrid taste, and has little human impact. However, according to one Spanish web site it may be dried, ground up, and used as a condiment. One 1948 paper states that this species generates hydrogen cyanide (HCN) in detectable amounts, suggesting that it is poisonous. However the same paper lists other mushrooms normally considered edible, such as Infundibulicybe geotropa, as having the same characteristic, so it is difficult to know how much significance to attribute to this observation.

== Links ==
- Collybiopsis peronata in Index Fungorum.
- "Gymnopus peronatus". National Center for Biotechnology Information (NCBI).
