= Pusillomyces =

Scientific classification
- Kingdom: Fungi
- Division: Basidiomycota
- Class: Agaricomycetes
- Order: Agaricales
- Family: Omphalotaceae
- Genus: Pusillomyces; J.S.Oliveira

Species
- See text.

Genus of fungi

Pusillomyces is a genus of fungi in the family Omphalotaceae. It was described as new to science in 2019, based on DNA analysis of various members of the family Omphalotaceae. As of September 2026, the Catalogue of Life accepts four species.

== Species ==
- Pusillomyces asetosus (Antonín, Ryoo & Ka) J.S. Oliveira
- Pusillomyces funalis (Har. Takah.) J.S. Oliveira
- Pusillomyces manuripioides J.S. Oliveira
- Pusillomyces spinulosus César, Bandala & Montoya
