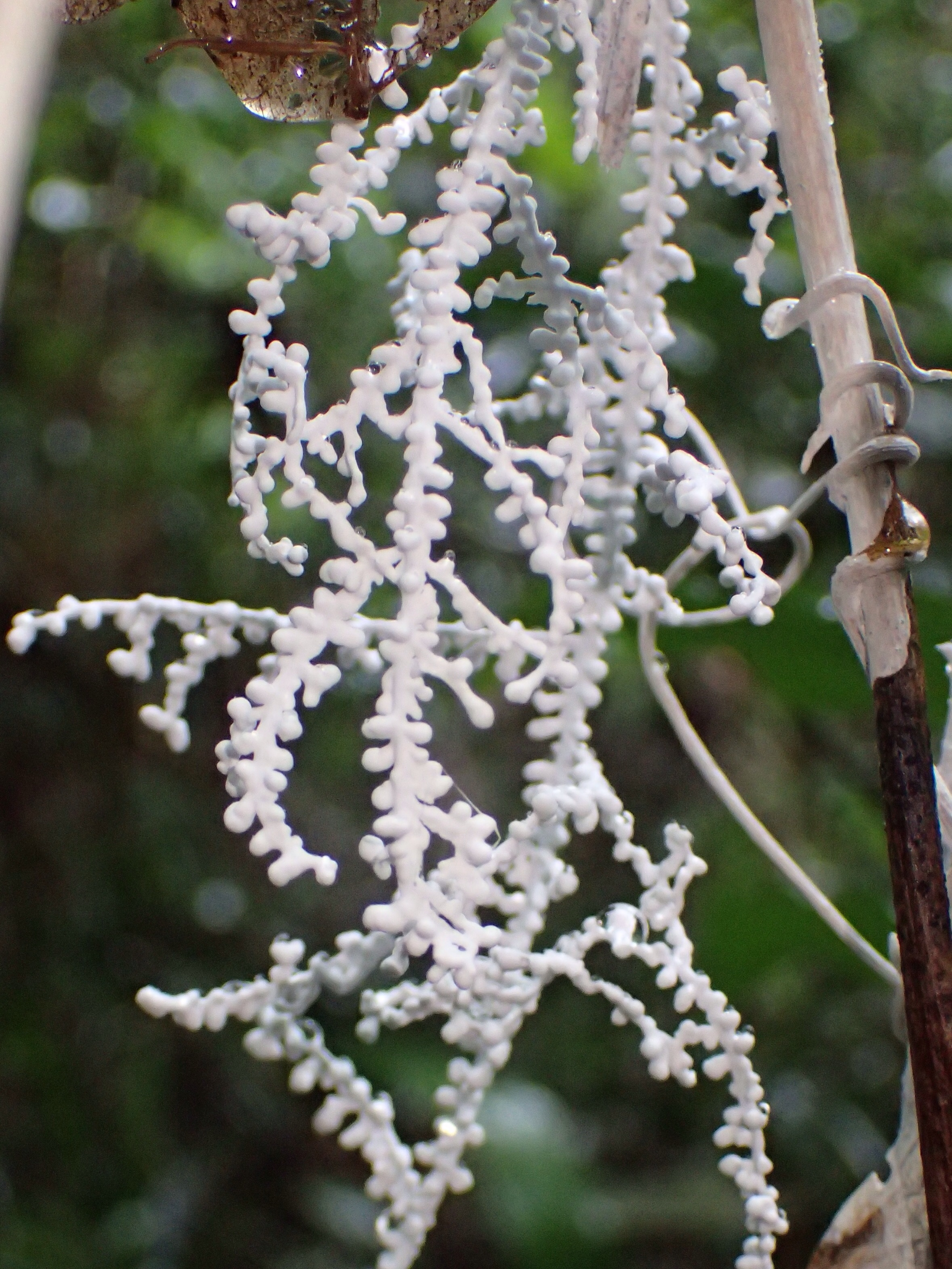
- Brunneocorticium corynecarpon

Scientific classification
- Kingdom: Fungi
- Division: Basidiomycota
- Class: Agaricomycetes
- Order: Agaricales
- Family: Omphalotaceae
- Genus: Brunneocorticium; Sheng H. Wu (2007)

Type species
- Brunneocorticium pyriforme Sheng H. Wu (2007)

Species
- B. pyriforme B. bisporum B. corynecarpon

= Brunneocorticium =

Genus of fungi

Brunneocorticium is a genus of fungi which following DNA analysis has been placed in the family Omphalotaceae. The genus, described in 2007, contains two corticioid species and one species (B. corynecarpon) which does not seem to have any fruiting body.

Whilst B. bisporum is a crust fungus, B. corynecarpon is known only from its sterile flat mycelial threads (rhizomorphs) with knob-like side-shoots which spread in the rain-forest canopy. They trap leaf-litter and harm the shrubs and trees on which they grow, as well as sometimes being used by birds as nesting material. B. corynecarpon has been observed in Suriname, Belize, Guyana, Peru, and Brazil.
