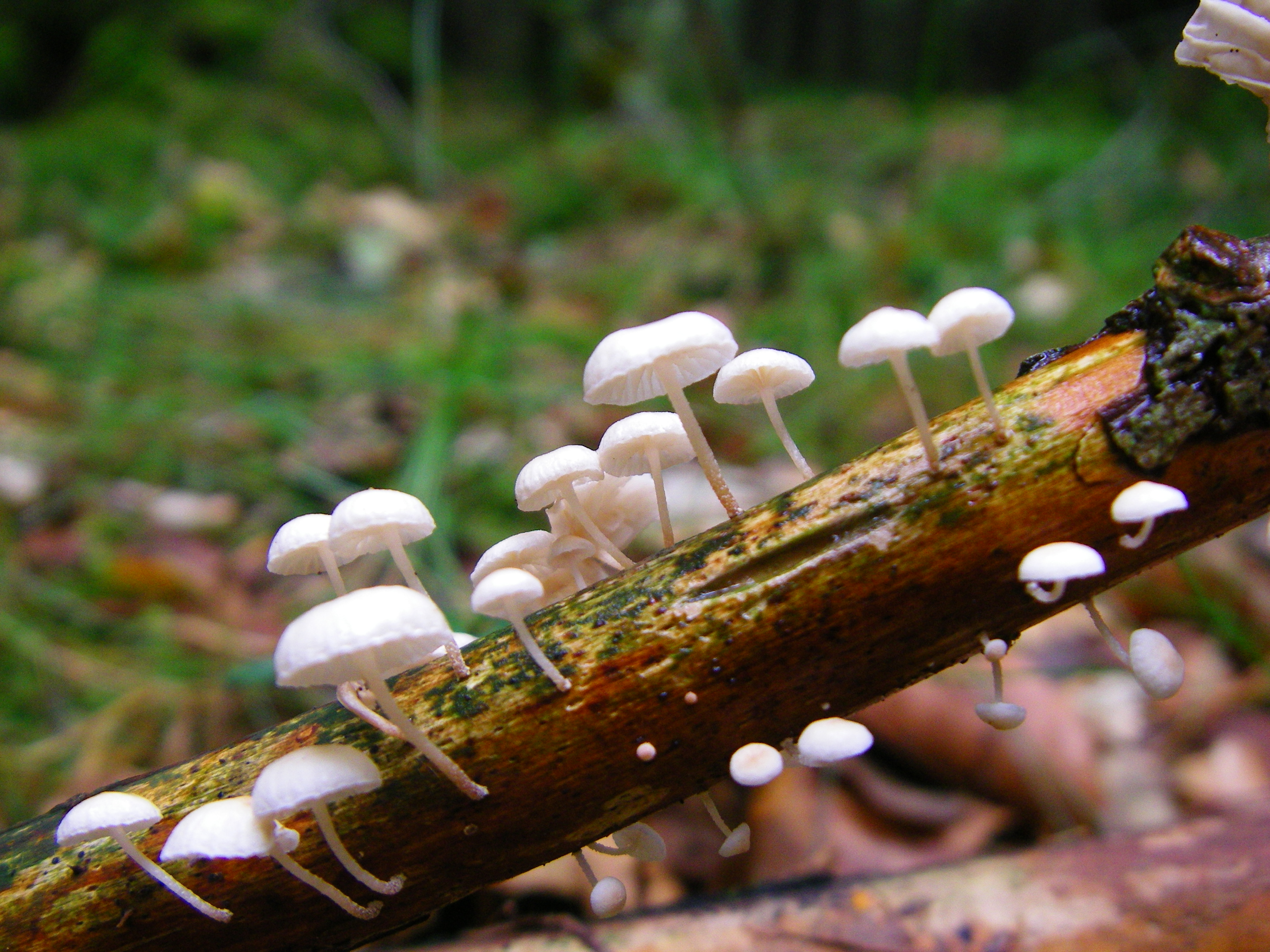
- Marasmiellus ramealis

Scientific classification
- Kingdom: Fungi
- Division: Basidiomycota
- Class: Agaricomycetes
- Order: Agaricales
- Family: Omphalotaceae
- Genus: Marasmiellus; Murrill (1915)

Type species
- Marasmiellus juniperinus Murrill (1915)

Species
- See text.

= Marasmiellus =

Genus of fungi

Marasmiellus is a genus of fungi in the family Omphalotaceae. The widespread genus, circumscribed by American mycologist William Murrill in 1915, contains over 250 species. The name comes from the Greek marasmus meaning wasting.

== Morphology and life cycle ==
The morphology of Marasmiellus has received little attention compared to other genera of Omphalotaceae, mainly due to their uncolorful pileus, small basidiocarps, and little variation in morphological characters. These factors complicate delimitations of species within this genus. Species of Marasmiellus have prostrate and diverticulate hyphae, which have no clear orientation. However, it has been observed that other hyphae can aggregate in fascicles and be radially oriented. Furthermore, cheilocystidia arise from horizontal hyphae and are frequently embedded in the hymenium, often being prostrate. Some species of Marasmiellus use basidiospore germination, and distinguishing different genera based on reproduction would depend on the speed of germination. During germination spores of Marasmiellus tend to disperse in dilution platings. Some species are tetrapolar. Additionally, no bipolar or amphithallic taxa in this genus have been reported, which is unexpected, as this mating behavior is common for tropical agarics, by allowing rapid colonizations. Their basidiocarps are collybioid or omphalioid and they have a white spore print. The cutis consis of a pileipellis, which sometimes transitions into a trichoderm, either with or without Rameales-structure.

== Ecology ==
Species of Marasmiellus are distributed around tropical and sub-tropical forested areas around the world, where they play a significant ecological role by being saprotrophic, degrading leafy and woody remains. Some species are parasitic and attack certain plants that are economically important, such as sugar cane, maize, bananas, and coconut palms. Observations of rhizomorph-forming species of Marasmiellus have also been confirmed (e.g Marasmiellus tenerrimus var setulosu and Marasmiellus opacu).

== Taxonomy ==
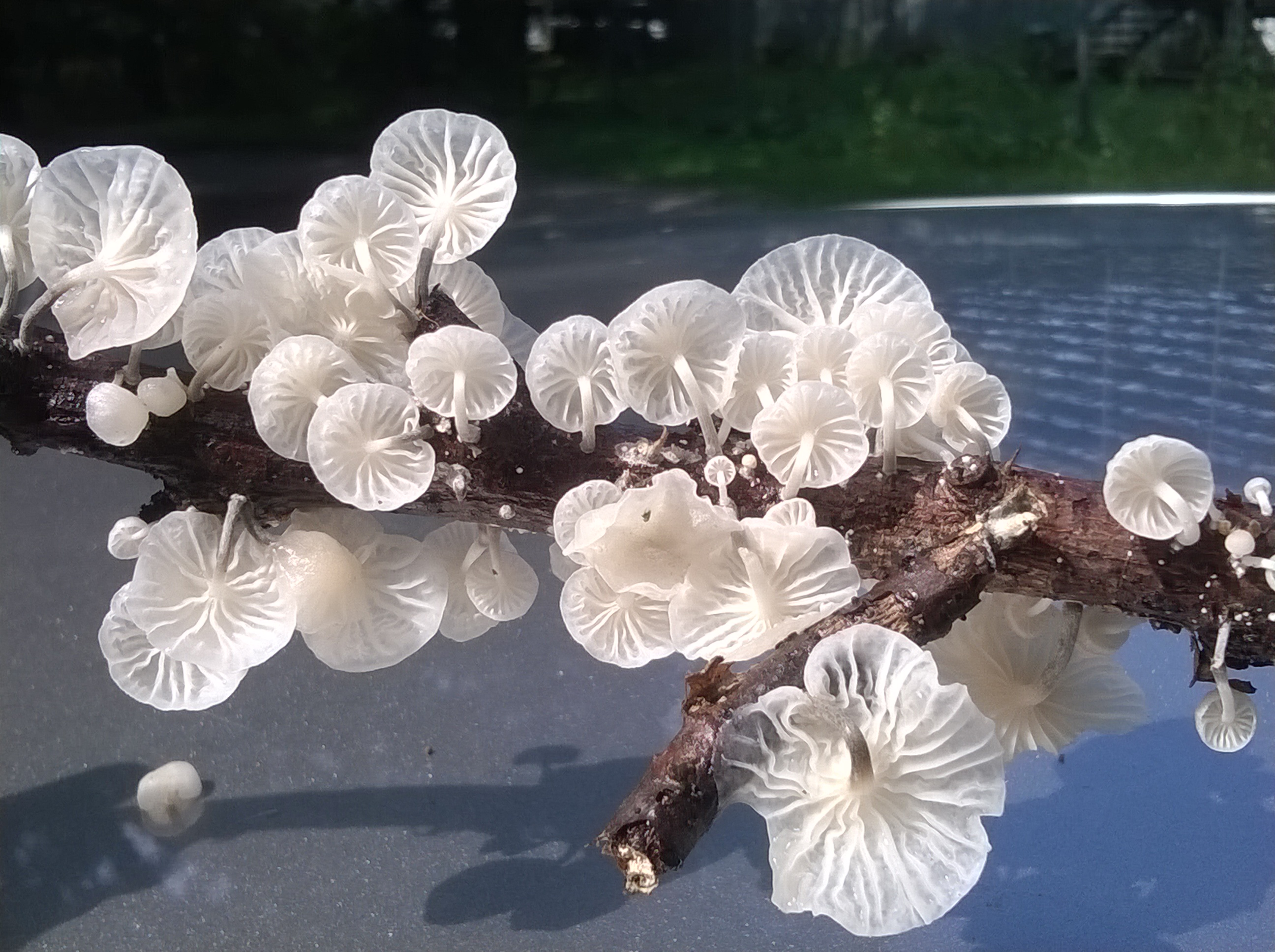
Marasmiellus candidus (Bolton) Singer

Marasmiellus only represented three species when it was first described by William Murrill (Marasmiellus inconspicuous Murrill (Cuba), Marasmiellus purpureus (Berk. & Curt.) Murrill (Cuba), and Marasmiellus juniperinus Murrill (Jamaica)). Currently the genera consists of more than 250 species, of which the type species, M. juniperinus, remains the same as when the genera was first described. Marasmiellus was traditionally included in Tricholomataceae R. Heim ex Pouzar, but later DNA studies showed that parts of the genus belong to Omphalotaceae, which was described by A. Bresinsky in 1985. Furthermore, several studies show that the Marasmiellus branched as multiple polyphyletic and artificial groups. This has led to conflict surrounding its position relative to Gymnopus, and has resulted in two opposing views regarding their taxonomy: 1) Marasmiellus is encompassed within Gymnopus (inclusive), or 2) Marasmiellus remains a distinct genus from Gymnopus (restrictive). The most recent studies have shown that the second hypothesis is the strongest, placing Marasmiellus as a separate genus, but more research is required to confirm this.

== Species ==
- Marasmiellus afer
- Marasmiellus affixus
- Marasmiellus albiceps
- Marasmiellus albifolius
- Marasmiellus albobrunnescens
- Marasmiellus albofuscus
- Marasmiellus alliiodorus
- Marasmiellus alneus
- Marasmiellus alvaradoi
- Marasmiellus amazoniensis
- Marasmiellus ambiguus
- Marasmiellus amphicystis
- Marasmiellus amygdalosporus
- Marasmiellus anastomosus
- Marasmiellus androsaceiformis
- Marasmiellus angustispermus
- Marasmiellus anomalus
- Marasmiellus antarcticus
- Marasmiellus anthocephalus
- Marasmiellus aporposeptus
- Marasmiellus appalachianus
- Marasmiellus aquilus
- Marasmiellus atropapillatus
- Marasmiellus atrosetosus
- Marasmiellus atrostipitatus
- Marasmiellus aurantiorufescens
- Marasmiellus baeosporoides
- Marasmiellus baeosporus
- Marasmiellus bambusicola
- Marasmiellus bauhiniae
- Marasmiellus berkeleyi
- Marasmiellus bermudensis
- Marasmiellus bisporiger
- Marasmiellus bolivarianus
- Marasmiellus bonaerensis
- Marasmiellus bonii
- Marasmiellus brevisporus
- Marasmiellus brunneocarpus
- Marasmiellus brunneomarginatus
- Marasmiellus caatingensis
- Marasmiellus caesioater
- Marasmiellus caespitosus
- Marasmiellus calami
- Marasmiellus californicus
- Marasmiellus candidus
- Marasmiellus caracasensis
- Marasmiellus carneopallidus
- Marasmiellus castaneidiscus
- Marasmiellus catephes
- Marasmiellus celebanticus
- Marasmiellus chamaecyparidis
- Marasmiellus chilensis
- Marasmiellus cinchonensis
- Marasmiellus cinereus
- Marasmiellus clitocybe
- Marasmiellus clusilis
- Marasmiellus cnacopolius
- Marasmiellus cocophilus
- Marasmiellus cocosensis
- Marasmiellus coilobasis
- Marasmiellus colocasiae
- Marasmiellus columbianus
- Marasmiellus confertifolius
- Marasmiellus contrarius
- Marasmiellus corsicus
- Marasmiellus corticigenus
- Marasmiellus corticum
- Marasmiellus corynophloeus
- Marasmiellus couleu
- Marasmiellus crassitunicatus
- Marasmiellus crinipelloides
- Marasmiellus cubensis
- Marasmiellus cupreovirens
- Marasmiellus curtipes
- Marasmiellus cystidiosus
- Marasmiellus daguae
- Marasmiellus dealbatus
- Marasmiellus defibulatus
- Marasmiellus delicius
- Marasmiellus delilei
- Marasmiellus dendroegrus
- Marasmiellus devenulatus
- Marasmiellus distantifolius
- Marasmiellus dryogeton
- Marasmiellus dunensis
- Marasmiellus earlei
- Marasmiellus eburneus
- Marasmiellus echinocephalus
- Marasmiellus elongatisporus
- Marasmiellus enodis
- Marasmiellus epibryus
- Marasmiellus epitrichialis
- Marasmiellus epochnous
- Marasmiellus eugeniae
- Marasmiellus filocystis
- Marasmiellus filopes
- Marasmiellus flaccidus
- Marasmiellus flosculus
- Marasmiellus foliicola
- Marasmiellus foliorum
- Marasmiellus fusicystis
- Marasmiellus gigantosporus
- Marasmiellus gilvus
- Marasmiellus gomez-pompae
- Marasmiellus goossensiae
- Marasmiellus gossypinulus
- Marasmiellus graminis
- Marasmiellus gregarius
- Marasmiellus guadelupensis
- Marasmiellus guatopoensis
- Marasmiellus guzmanii
- Marasmiellus hapuuarum
- Marasmiellus helminthocystis
- Marasmiellus hirtellus
- Marasmiellus hondurensis
- Marasmiellus humillimus
- Marasmiellus hypolissus
- Marasmiellus idroboi
- Marasmiellus ignobilis
- Marasmiellus iguazuensis
- Marasmiellus illinorum
- Marasmiellus incarnatipallens
- Marasmiellus inconspicuus
- Marasmiellus incrustatus
- Marasmiellus inoderma
- Marasmiellus inodermatoides
- Marasmiellus juniperinus
- Marasmiellus junquitoensis
- Marasmiellus keralensis
- Marasmiellus kindyerracola
- Marasmiellus koreanus
- Marasmiellus laschiopsis
- Marasmiellus lassei
- Marasmiellus lateralis
- Marasmiellus latispermus
- Marasmiellus laurifoliae
- Marasmiellus lecythidacearum
- Marasmiellus leiophyllus
- Marasmiellus leptophyllus
- Marasmiellus leucophyllus
- Marasmiellus luteus
- Marasmiellus lysochlorus
- Marasmiellus maas-geesterani
- Marasmiellus mariluanensis
- Marasmiellus maritimus
- Marasmiellus martynii
- Marasmiellus merulius
- Marasmiellus mesosporus
- Marasmiellus microscopicus
- Marasmiellus milicae
- Marasmiellus minutalis
- Marasmiellus minutus
- Marasmiellus misionensis
- Marasmiellus musacearum
- Marasmiellus nanus
- Marasmiellus napoensis
- Marasmiellus nivosus
- Marasmiellus nodosus
- Marasmiellus nothofagineus
- Marasmiellus nubigenus
- Marasmiellus oblongisporus
- Marasmiellus oligocinsulae
- Marasmiellus omphaloides
- Marasmiellus omphalophorus
- Marasmiellus orinocensis
- Marasmiellus osmophorus
- Marasmiellus osornensis
- Marasmiellus pachycraspedum
- Marasmiellus pacificus
- Marasmiellus paludosus
- Marasmiellus panamensis
- Marasmiellus pandoensis
- Marasmiellus pantholocystis
- Marasmiellus papillatomarginatus
- Marasmiellus papillatus
- Marasmiellus papillifer
- Marasmiellus paraensis
- Marasmiellus paralacteus
- Marasmiellus parlatorei
- Marasmiellus paspali
- Marasmiellus patouillardii
- Marasmiellus peckii
- Marasmiellus perangustispermnus
- Marasmiellus pernambucensis
- Marasmiellus petchii
- Marasmiellus petiolicola
- Marasmiellus petiolorum
- Marasmiellus peullensis
- Marasmiellus phaeomarasmioides
- Marasmiellus phaeophyllus
- Marasmiellus picipes
- Marasmiellus pilosus
- Marasmiellus platyhyphes
- Marasmiellus pluvius
- Marasmiellus polyphyllus
- Marasmiellus potamogeton
- Marasmiellus potassiovirens
- Marasmiellus praeacutus
- Marasmiellus primulae
- Marasmiellus primulinus
- Marasmiellus pruinosulus
- Marasmiellus pseudogracilis
- Marasmiellus pseudoparaphysatus
- Marasmiellus pseudoramealis
- Marasmiellus pulchellus
- Marasmiellus pusillimus
- Marasmiellus pygmaeus
- Marasmiellus quercinus
- Marasmiellus radiatim-plicatus
- Marasmiellus ramealis
- Marasmiellus ramorum
- Marasmiellus rawakensis
- Marasmiellus rhizomorphogenus
- Marasmiellus rhodophyllus
- Marasmiellus riberaltensis
- Marasmiellus rosascentifolius
- Marasmiellus roseipallens
- Marasmiellus roseotinctus
- Marasmiellus rubellus
- Marasmiellus rugulosus
- Marasmiellus saccharophilus
- Marasmiellus salmonicolor
- Marasmiellus sanctae-marthae
- Marasmiellus scandens
- Marasmiellus schiffneri
- Marasmiellus segregabilis
- Marasmiellus senescens
- Marasmiellus sinensis
- Marasmiellus sotae
- Marasmiellus sphaerosporus
- Marasmiellus sprucei
- Marasmiellus stenocystis
- Marasmiellus stenophylloides
- Marasmiellus stenosporus
- Marasmiellus stratosus
- Marasmiellus stypinoides
- Marasmiellus stypinus
- Marasmiellus subaurantiacus
- Marasmiellus subcoracinus
- Marasmiellus subdealbatus
- Marasmiellus subepiphyllus
- Marasmiellus subfumosus
- Marasmiellus subgraminis
- Marasmiellus subhirtellus
- Marasmiellus subingratus
- Marasmiellus subinodermatoides
- Marasmiellus subnigricans
- Marasmiellus subochraceus
- Marasmiellus subolivaceomelleus
- Marasmiellus subpumilus
- Marasmiellus subramealis
- Marasmiellus synodicus
- Marasmiellus tener
- Marasmiellus tenerrimus
- Marasmiellus tetrachrous
- Marasmiellus thaxteri
- Marasmiellus trabutii
- Marasmiellus trichodermialis
- Marasmiellus tricolor
- Marasmiellus tropicalis
- Marasmiellus troyanus
- Marasmiellus ugandensis
- Marasmiellus umbilicatus
- Marasmiellus umbonifer
- Marasmiellus usambarensis
- Marasmiellus vaillantii
- Marasmiellus varzeae
- Marasmiellus vernalis
- Marasmiellus vinosus
- Marasmiellus violaceogriseus
- Marasmiellus violae
- Marasmiellus virgatocutis
- Marasmiellus viridifuscus
- Marasmiellus volvatus
- Marasmiellus xerophyticus
- Marasmiellus yalae

== See also ==
- List of Marasmiaceae genera
