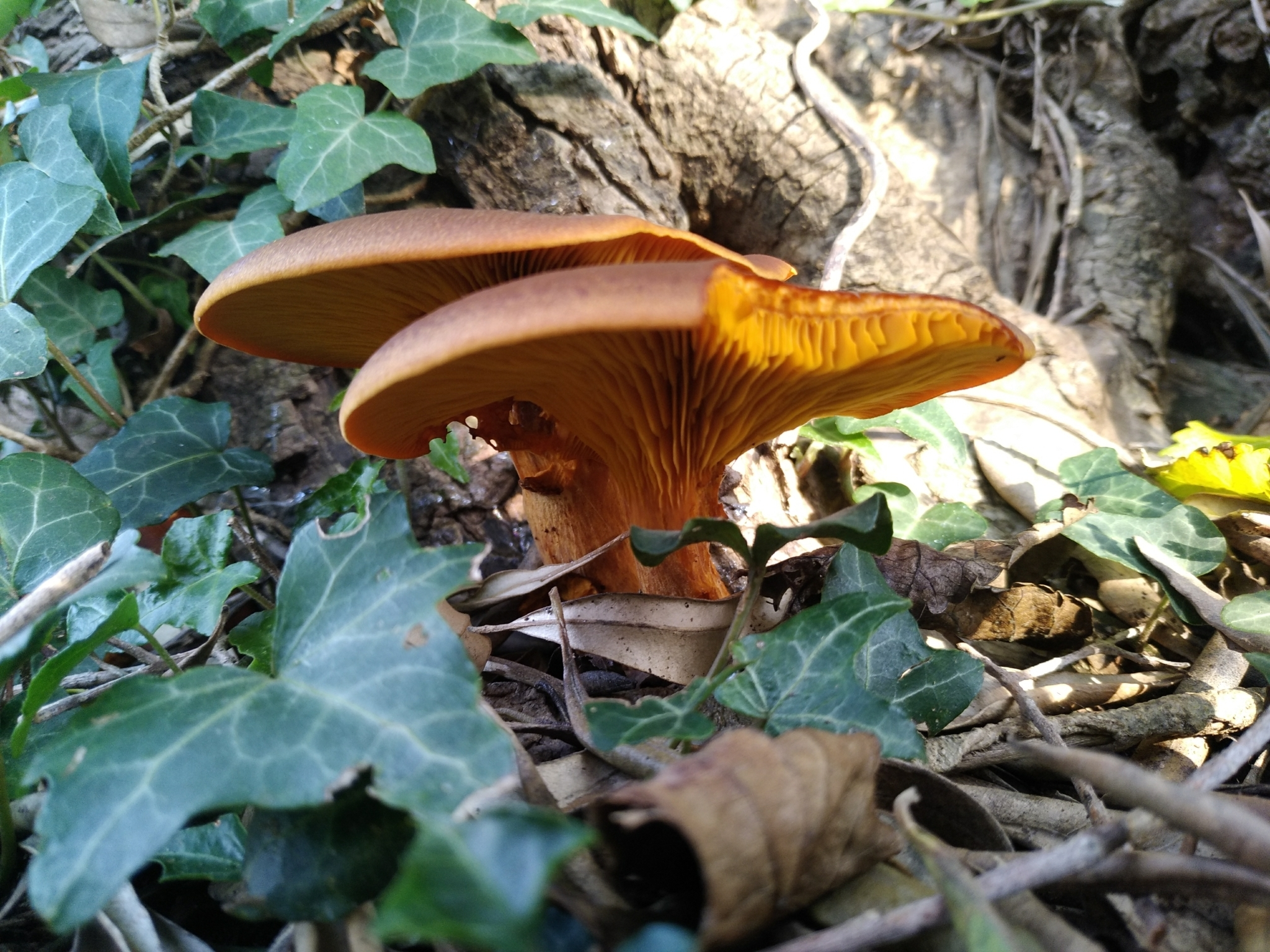
- Omphalotus olearius

Scientific classification
- Kingdom: Fungi
- Division: Basidiomycota
- Class: Agaricomycetes
- Order: Agaricales
- Family: Omphalotaceae; Bresinsky (1985)

Type genus
- Omphalotus Fayod (1889)

Genera
- Anthracophyllum; Brunneocorticium; Collybiopsis; Connopus; Gymnopanella; Gymnopus; Hymenoporus; Lentinula; Marasmiellus; Mycetinis; Neonothopanus; Omphalotus; Paragymnopus; Paramycetinis; Pseudomarasmius; Pusillomyces; Rhodocollybia

= Omphalotaceae =

Family of fungi

The Omphalotaceae are a family of fungi in the order Agaricales. Basidiocarps (fruit bodies) are most frequently agarics (gilled mushrooms), but occasionally corticioid (in the genus Brunneocorticium) or poroid (in the genus Hymenoporus).

== Taxonomy ==
The family was originally described in 1985 by German mycologist Andreas Bresinsky to accommodate the genus Omphalotus (including Lampteromyces) based on anatomical and morphological characters which he considered distinctive. He placed the family within the Boletales. Subsequent molecular research, based on cladistic analysis of DNA sequences, indicated, however, that Omphalotus belonged within the Agaricales. Moreover, the genus formed a monophyletic clade with a much larger group of fungi, many of which were formerly placed in the Marasmiaceae. The earliest name for this clade is the Omphalotaceae.

== See also ==
- List of Agaricales families
