= Amanita griseorosea =

Scientific classification
- Kingdom: Fungi
- Division: Basidiomycota
- Class: Agaricomycetes
- Order: Agaricales
- Family: Amanitaceae
- Genus: Amanita
- Species: A. griseorosea

Binomial name
- Amanita griseorosea Qing Cai, Zhu L. Yang & Y.Y. Cui

Species of fungus

Amanita griseorosea is a mushroom of the large genus Amanita, that occurs under beech trees in southern China (Hainan and Yunnan Provinces). It has a pale pink to grayish cap and a volva. Amanita griseorosea is poisonous and may be lethal. ingesting the mushroom will cause gastroenteritis and liver damage, and in severe cases, can cause liver failure or death. It is closely related to A. molliuscula.

== See also ==
- List of Amanita species
- List of deadly fungi
