= Amanita molliuscula =

Scientific classification
- Kingdom: Fungi
- Division: Basidiomycota
- Class: Agaricomycetes
- Order: Agaricales
- Family: Amanitaceae
- Genus: Amanita
- Species: A. molliuscula

Binomial name
- Amanita molliuscula Qing Cai, Zhu L. Yang & Y.Y. Cui

Species of fungus

Amanita molliuscula is a mushroom of the large genus Amanita, that occurs under beech trees in Shaanxi Province in China.The mushroom is poisonous and may sometimes be lethal; it has affected 19 patients and caused 2 confirmed deaths. It is closely related to A. griseorosea.

== See also ==
- List of Amanita species
- List of deadly fungi
