= Leucocoprinus inflatus =

Scientific classification
- Kingdom: Fungi
- Division: Basidiomycota
- Class: Agaricomycetes
- Order: Agaricales
- Family: Agaricaceae
- Genus: Leucocoprinus
- Species: L. inflatus

Binomial name
- Leucocoprinus inflatus Raithelh. (1987)

Species of fungus

Leucocoprinus inflatus is a species of mushroom producing fungus in the family Agaricaceae.

== Taxonomy ==
It was described in 1987 by the mycologist Jörg Raithelhuber who classified it as Leucocoprinus inflatus.

Raithelhuber based his classification on Lepiota trombophora Berk. & Broome ss. Johannes Rick in Iheringia : Série Botânica 8 - Basidiomycetes Eubasidii in Rio Grande do Sul - Brasilia however this appears to be a typo as the correct name (and the name used by Rick) is Lepiota thrombophora.

Agaricus (Lepiota) thrombophorus was described in 1871 by the British mycologists Miles Joseph Berkeley and Christopher Edmund Broome and classified as Lepiota thrombophora by Pier Andrea Saccardo in 1887.

Raithelhuber states that the species described by Rick is not the same as that described by Berk. & Broome however and notes that no preserved material from Rick exists for this species so Raithelhuber's classification of Leucocoprinus inflatus is based on Rick's description with the spore size quoted directly from Rick. Raithelhuber notes that Leucocoprinus inflatus may possibly just be a variety of Leucocoprinus bulbipes and the spore size of the two species is very similar.

Rick also notes a similarity to Lepiota alborussa and Lepiota clypeolariae.

== Description ==
Leucocoprinus inflatus is a small dapperling mushroom.

Cap: 2.5-3.5cm wide with thin, almost membranous flesh and striations across almost the entire cap. The surface is pale with black fibrous scales and a very dark umbo. Stem: 3.5-4.5cm long, 3mm wide at the top and 7mm at the bulbous base. The surface is white with a powdery coating and the stem ring is white, wide and hanging. Gills: White but discolouring slightly yellow with age. Somewhat distant and bulging in the middle with denticulate edges. Spores: Smooth with a visible pore. 10-12 x 7-9 μm.

Lepiota thrombophora was described by Berk and Broome as having a white, conical cap covered with lumpy brown scales, a furfuraceous stem and white gills.

== Etymology ==
The specific epithet inflatus is Latin for swollen up.

== Habitat and distribution ==
The specimens were found growing on the ground in Brazil.
