= Calonarius pseudocupreorufus =

Scientific classification
- Kingdom: Fungi
- Division: Basidiomycota
- Class: Agaricomycetes
- Order: Agaricales
- Family: Cortinariaceae
- Genus: Calonarius
- Species: C. pseudocupreorufus

Binomial name
- Calonarius pseudocupreorufus (Niskanen, Liimat. & Ammirati) Niskanen & Liimat. (2022)

Synonyms
- Cortinarius orichalceus var. olympianus A.H.Sm. (1944); Cortinarius pseudocupreorufus Niskanen, Liimat. & Ammirati (2014)

Species of fungus

Calonarius pseudocupreorufus is a species of fungus in the family Cortinariaceae.

== Taxonomy ==
It was originally described as new to science in 1944 by the American mycologist Alexander H. Smith who classified it as a variety of Cortinarius orichalceus.

In 2014 molecular and morphological data suggested that it was sufficiently distinct to warrant recognition as a distinct species and it was classified as Cortinarius pseudocupreorufus, placed in the Cortinarius subgenus Phlegmacium.

In 2022 the species was transferred from Cortinarius and reclassified as Calonarius pseudocupreorufus based on genomic data.

== Description ==
Cap: 30-100mm, convex to plano-convex, margin inrolled to decurved, viscid, colors mutable with age and exposure – at first yellowish-grey to olive-grey, sometimes mottled lilac-grey, disc darkening to warm brown to rich red-brown with buffer of yellow ochre, scales and patches in center of disc when mature. Flesh: Translucent grey-blue to yellowish blue, to lilac tinged, stipe base mottled white and grey in WA specimens but with distinctive red-pink blush in stipe base in some collections, below pileus lilac to pink. Gills: Close, lilac-grey at outer edge when young, pale dingy yellow at inner margin then yellow to olive yellow overall. Stipe: 35-85mm long, and 8-21mm wide at apex, abruptly bulbous to bulbous, sometimes turnip shaped, colored pale creamy yellow, olive yellow, or bluish tones with abundant cortina remnants; bulb bruises red when handled, particularly on bulb rim. Odor: No odor, taste mild. Dried fruitbodies: Dark burgundy with lilac tones to context. Habitat: Old growth conifer forest. KOH: On flesh: olive-grey, slowly browning. On cap: red-brown to wine-red. Interestingly, the wine-red on cap is not noted in the European description.

Discussion

‘Cupreorufus’, copper-red in Latin, refers to the distinctive red-color of the mature-cap of this species. Cortinarius cupreorufus was named by Brandrud in 1994, but has long been known by its prior (misapplied) name of Cortinarius orichalecus (Fries). The earlier name was not available because it was applied by Batsch in 1789 to a different Agaricus.

During field-ID, consider Cortinarius cupreorufus when you are in a mature calcareous conifer forest (in area with soil rich in chalk or limestone) and find a phlegmaciod species that is highly variable in color (tones from olive greens to yellows, redbrown or even purplish red). The colors in the cap are formed as the olive grey young cap tones oxidise to red-brown or purplish red. The gills are a distinctive drab-yellow and bulb bruises red, especially at rim. Confirmation can be found from the dried collection which turns wine red. An interesting feature sometimes observed in section Laeticolor is a turnip shaped bulb (abrupt rim and triangular base).

Phylogenetics

Liimatainen et al. (2014) place Cortinarius cupreorufus in the broader section Calochroi and Fulvi or more narrowly, in section Laeticolores which contains several distinctive Phlegmaciods from the PNW region: Cortinarius luteicolor, Cortinarius aureofulvus, Cortinarius pseudocupreorufus and Cortinarius saxamontanus. Laeticolor means “joyful color” and the species in this section are especially strong and variable with olive-yellow, yellow, red-brown and even purple tones.

== Etymology ==
The specific epithet pseudocupreorufus refers to its resemblance to Calonarius cupreorufus.

== See also ==
- List of Cortinarius species
