= Calonarius oliveopetasatus =

Scientific classification
- Kingdom: Fungi
- Division: Basidiomycota
- Class: Agaricomycetes
- Order: Agaricales
- Family: Cortinariaceae
- Genus: Calonarius
- Species: C. oliveopetasatus

Binomial name
- Calonarius oliveopetasatus (M.M. Moser) Niskanen & Liimat.

Synonyms
- Cortinarius oliveopetasatus M.M. Moser

Species of fungus

Calonarius oliveopetasatus
- Mycological characteristics
- Gills on hymenium
- Cap is convex
- Hymenium is emarginate
- Stipe has a cortina
- Spore print is reddish-brown
- Ecology is mycorrhizal
- Edibility is unknown

Calonarius oliveopetasatus, formerly known as Cortinarius oliveopetasatus, is a species of mushroom in the family Cortinariaceae. It is rare.

== Description ==
The cap of Calonarius oliveopetasatus starts out dark green, before becoming olive brown as the mushroom gets older. It starts out round or convex and becomes convex or flat. The gills start out buff in color and become yellowish and eventually rusty brown. The stipe is about 5.5-10 centimeters long and 1–2.5 centimeters wide. It has a bulbous base that is about 2.5-4.5 centimeters wide. The stipe is yellowish to brownish. A cortina is present and the spore print is rusty brown. The spores can be almond-shaped or lemon shaped, and there are four spores per basidium. Cheliocystidia are absent, but clamp connections are present. When potassium hydroxide is applied, the cap of the mushroom turns orangish brown and the stipe turns dark brown.

== Habitat and ecology ==
Calonarius oliveopetasatus grows under conifers such as douglas fir. It is found on the Olympic Peninsula and in the Cascades, where it grows in old-growth forests.
