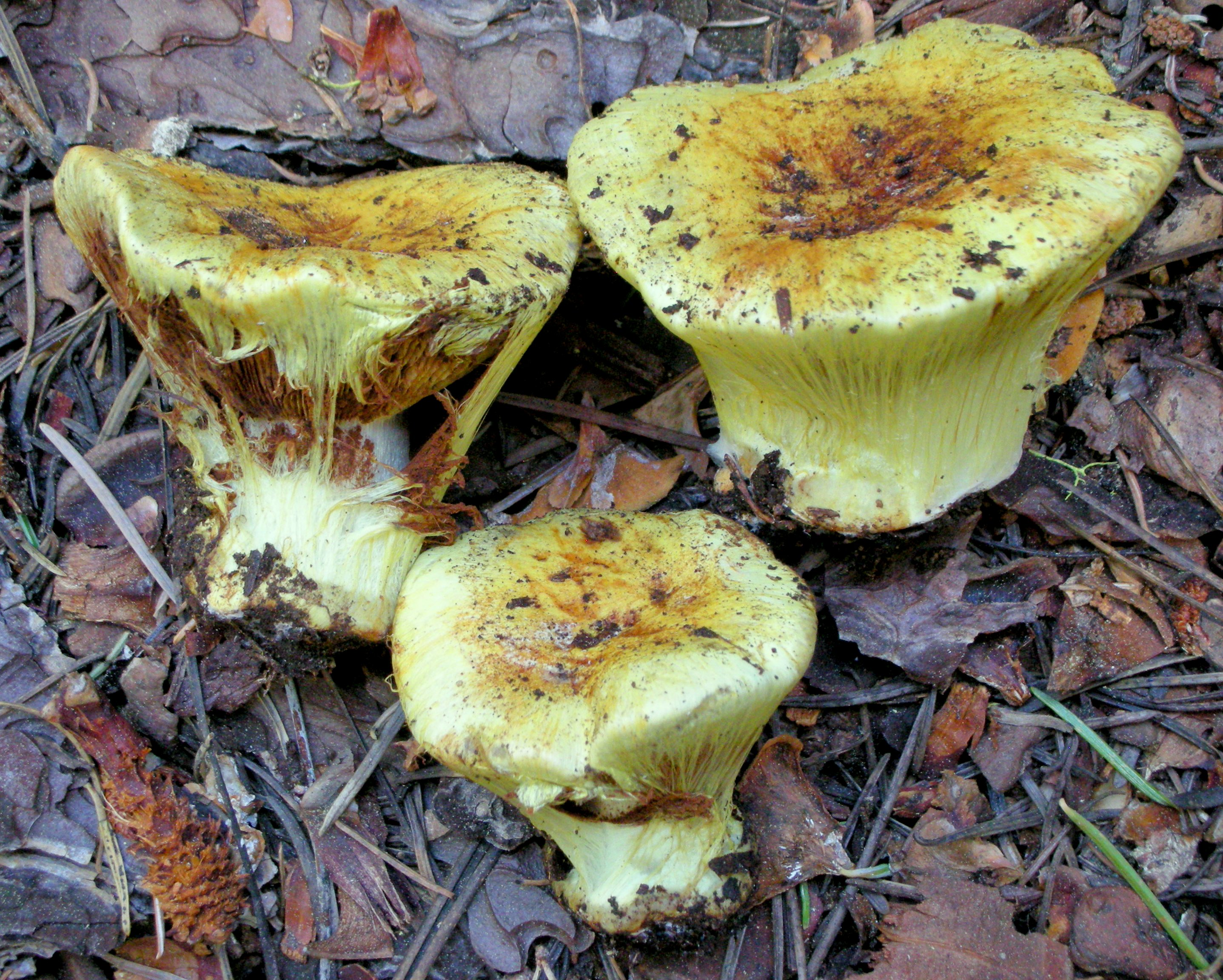

Scientific classification
- Kingdom: Fungi
- Division: Basidiomycota
- Class: Agaricomycetes
- Order: Agaricales
- Family: Cortinariaceae
- Genus: Calonarius
- Species: C. verrucisporus

Binomial name
- Calonarius verrucisporus (Thiers & A.H.Sm.) Niskanen & Liimat. (2022)

Synonyms
- Cortinarius verrucisporus Thiers & A.H. Sm. (1969)

= Calonarius verrucisporus =

Species of fungus

Calonarius verrucisporus is a species of mushroom producing fungus in the family Cortinariaceae.

== Taxonomy ==
It was described as new to science in 1969 by the mycologists Harry Delbert Thiers and Alexander H. Smith who classified it as Cortinarius verrucisporus.

In 2022 the species was transferred from Cortinarius and reclassified as Calonarius verrucisporus based on genomic data.

== Description ==
The mushroom is brownish-yellow. Its cap is 3–7 cm wide, convex, brownish-yellow, dry, with firm yellow flesh, and mild odor and taste. The gills are adnate to notched, whitish to yellow, browning as the spores mature. The stalk is 1–3 cm tall, 1–2 cm wide, equal or clavate, with a yellow partial veil. The spores are brown, elliptical, and warted.

Its edibility is unknown, but it is not recommended due to its similarity to deadly poisonous species.

Cortinarius magnivelatus is similar in appearance, but with a white veil and flesh.

The species is characterized by a long-lasting membranous universal veil.

== Habitat and distribution ==
The specimens studied by Thiers and Smith were found growing solitary under Conifers in Silver Lake, California in June.

== See also ==
- List of Cortinarius species
