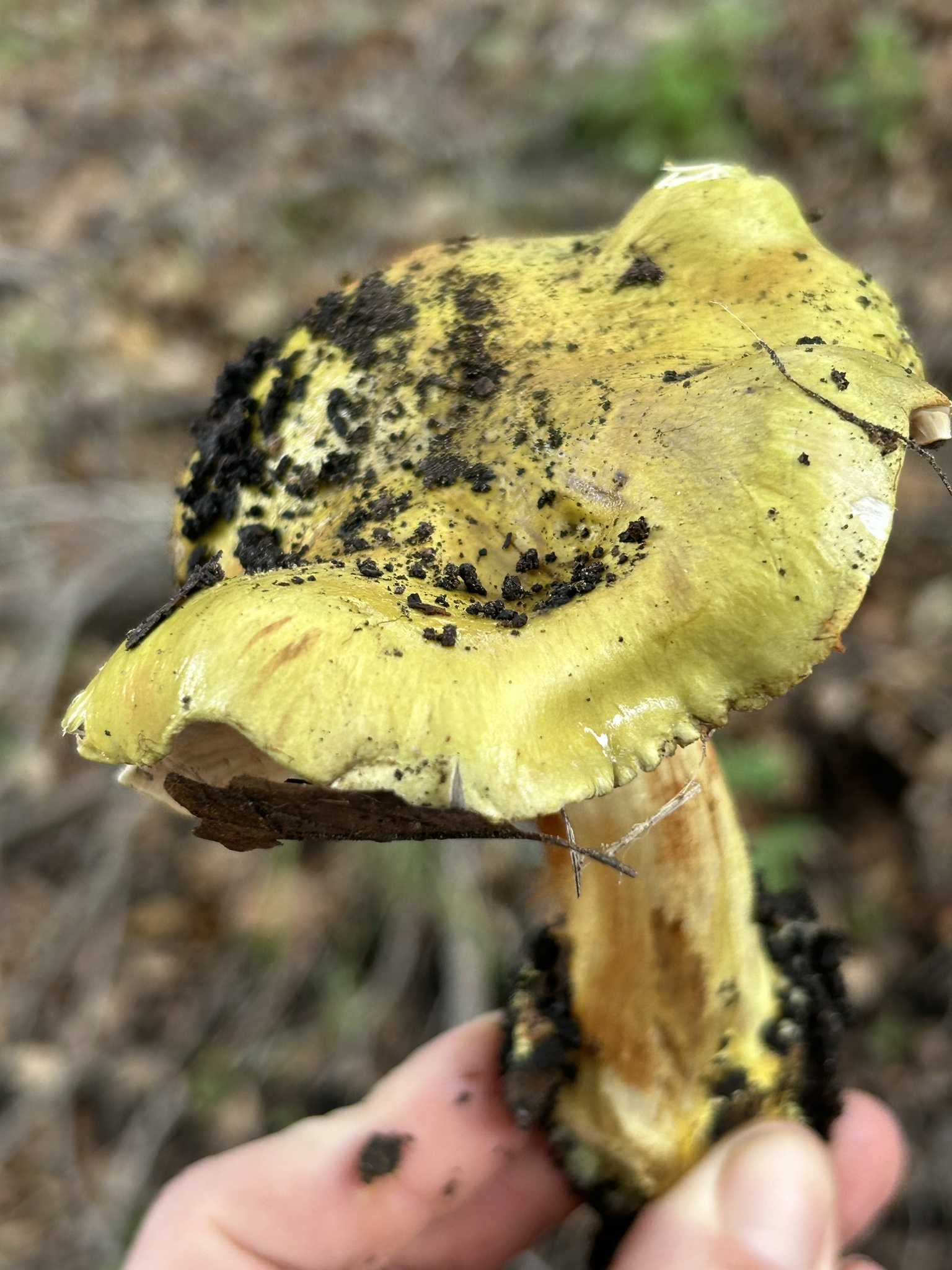
- San Luis Obispo County, California, 2022

Scientific classification
- Kingdom: Fungi
- Division: Basidiomycota
- Class: Agaricomycetes
- Order: Agaricales
- Family: Cortinariaceae
- Genus: Calonarius
- Species: C. viridirubescens

Binomial name
- Calonarius viridirubescens (M.M. Moser & Ammirati) Niskanen & Liimat. (2022)

Synonyms
- Cortinarius viridirubescens

= Calonarius viridirubescens =

Species of fungus

- Mycological characteristics
- Gills on hymenium
- Cap is convex
- Hymenium is emarginate
- Stipe has a cortina
- Spore print is reddish-brown
- Ecology is mycorrhizal
- Edibility is unknown

Calonarius viridirubescens is a species of gilled mushroom. First described to science in 1997, this species was previously classified as Cortinarius viridirubescens, and is thus commonly known as the yellow-green cort.

This California endemic mushroom's coloration is distinctive, with a chartreuse stipe to go with its yellow-green cap (the color can range from grass green to rusty orange). This mushroom has the "enlarged" bulb at the base that is typical of cortinarias, stains red in age, and according to the authors of Mushrooms of the Redwood Coast, has a "prominent cobwebby cortina of whitish yellow to light greenish yellow fibers over much of cap and stipe when young" but this feature is "ephemeral and often absent at maturity."

Typically found in oak woodlands, the fruiting triggers and edibility of the yellow-green calonarius remain undescribed.
