= Calonarius saxamontanus =

Scientific classification
- Kingdom: Fungi
- Division: Basidiomycota
- Class: Agaricomycetes
- Order: Agaricales
- Family: Cortinariaceae
- Genus: Calonarius
- Species: C. saxamontanus

Binomial name
- Calonarius saxamontanus (Fogel) Niskanen & Liimat.

Synonyms
- Cortinarius saxamontanus Fogel

Species of fungus

Calonarius saxamontanus
- Mycological characteristics
- Gills on hymenium
- Cap is convex or flat
- Hymenium is adnate or decurrent
- Stipe has a cortina
- Spore print is reddish-brown
- Ecology is mycorrhizal
- Edibility is unknown or inedible

Calonarius saxamontanus, formerly known as Cortinarius saxamontanus, is a species of mushroom in the family Cortinariaceae.

== Description ==
The cap of Calonarius saxamontanus is yellowish to brownish. It starts out round or convex, and becomes broadly convex or flat. It is about 3-7 centimeters in diameter. The stipe is about 4-4.8 centimeters long and 1.7-2.2 centimeters wide. It is yellowish to brownish in color and sometimes bulbous at the base. The gills start out yellow and become brown as the mushroom gets older. They can be adnate or decurrent. A thick, voluminous cortina covers the gills, making the gills only visible if the mushroom is old or the cortina is torn. The spore print is rusty brown.

Calonarius saxamontanus and several other species appear to be in the process of evolving into secotioid fungi. They still release their spores, but many are caught by the cortina.

== Habitat and ecology ==
Calonarius saxamontanus is found in dry coniferous forests in the eastern regions of the Pacific Northwest. It is found about 4,500 feet above sea level, and grows under fir and pine trees. It fruits during spring and early summer.
