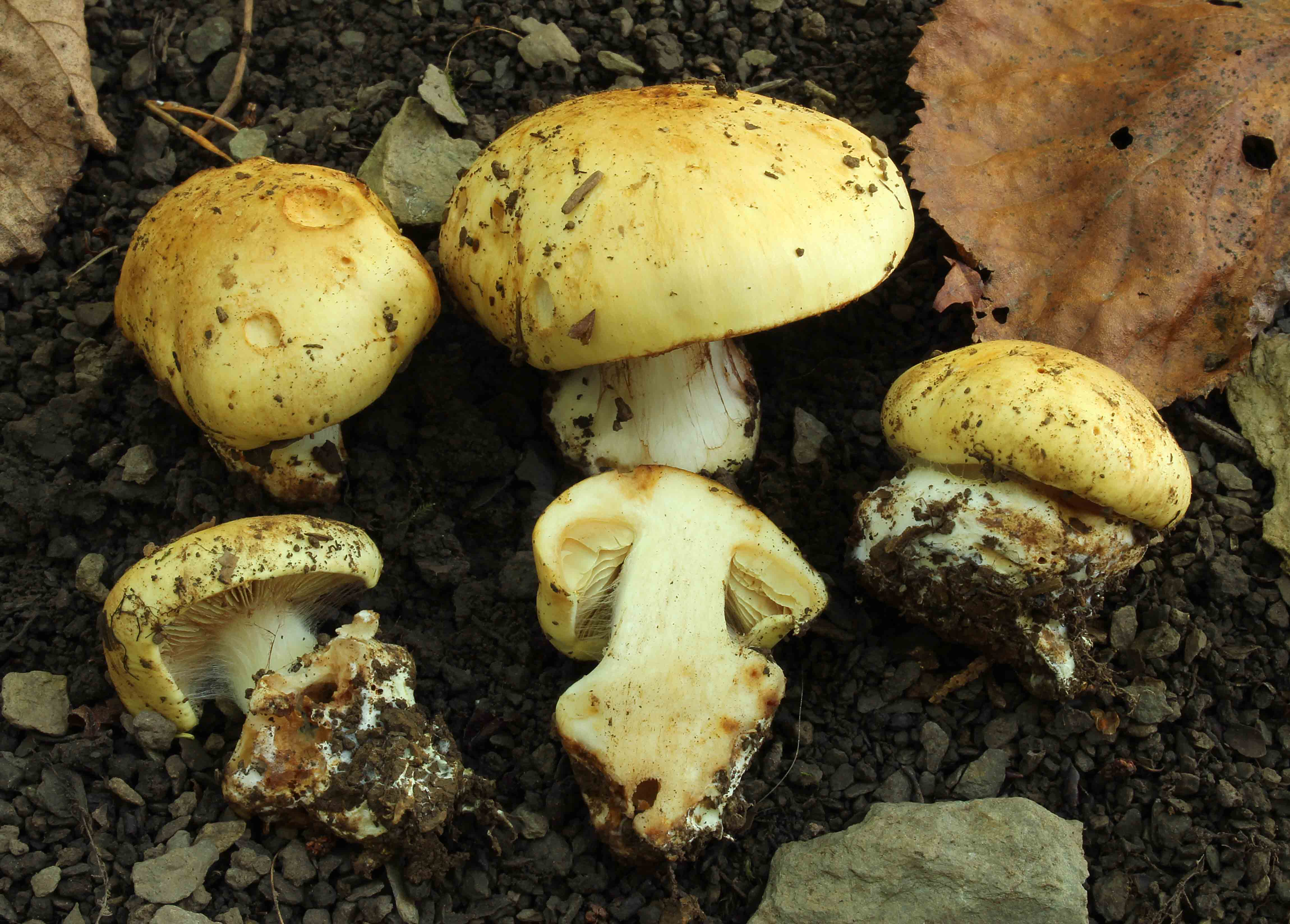

Conservation status
- Endangered (IUCN 3.1)

Scientific classification
- Kingdom: Fungi
- Division: Basidiomycota
- Class: Agaricomycetes
- Order: Agaricales
- Family: Cortinariaceae
- Genus: Calonarius
- Species: C. osloensis

Binomial name
- Calonarius osloensis (Brandrud, T.S. Jeppesen & Frøslev) Niskanen & Liimat. (2022)

Synonyms
- Cortinarius osloensis Brandrud, T.S. Jeppesen & Frøslev (2006)

= Calonarius osloensis =

Species of fungus

Calonarius osloensis Mycological characteristics
- Gills on hymenium
- Cap is convex
- Stipe has a cortina
- Ecology is mycorrhizal

Calonarius osloensis is a species of fungus in the family Cortinariaceae.

== Taxonomy ==
The species was described in 2014 and classified as Cortinarius osloensis.

In 2022 the species was transferred from Cortinarius and reclassified as Calonarius osloensis based on genomic data.

== Description ==
=== Macroscopic characteristics ===
The cap of Calonarius osloensis is 3-7 cm, first convex, then flattening out with age. The surface of the cap is sticky, glossy and smooth, though the centre sometimes has dense, matted hairs. The colour of the cap changes little with age, other than the margin darkening from white to ochre, the rest of the cap staying ochre yellow to brown.

The flesh is white when young, with spots on the stipe that stain yellowish-gray when wet. When damaged by a snail bite, the flesh can turn yellow.It does not change colour when stained with KOH. It has a radish- to dust-like earthy smell. Similarly, it tastes like radishes.

The stipe measures 4-6 x .8-1.5 cm and has a marginate bulb at its bottom that is up to 3 cm wide. It has a universal veil that can vary in prominence, and is yellow when young, later turning brown, and slightly sticky. The stipe has a white, abundant cortina.

Calonarius osloensis has crowded, 3-6 mm wide, yellowish gills, with slightly scalloped to serrated edges.

=== Microscopic characteristics ===
The spores measure 11-12.5 x 6.5-7.5 μm, and are lemon-shaped, with distinct warts, and a suprahilar plage (smooth part of spore next to hilar appendix). The basidia are 9 x 11 μm wide, and bear 4 spores each. The trama of the gills measure 3-20 μm wide.

== Habitat and distribution ==
It is native to south east Norway, specifically the Oslofjord area. It forms mycorrhiza with small-leaved linden trees, in calcareous (calcium-carbonate rich), shallow, soils with little leaf litter or humus.

The IUCN estimates there are 260 mature individuals of this species left, with a continuing decline. It is therefore listed as endangered. Threats to the species include the decline of calcareous linden forests due to the land being developed for residential areas, or limestone quarries. Additionally, the invasion of Picea abies (Norway spruce) trees from adjacent plantations, as well as increased thickets of Ash and Maple, cause the soils to become more humid and acidic.

== Similar species ==
It can be distinguished from Cortinarius calochrous by its yellow gills. Cortinarius humolens, while having a similar odour to Calonarius osloensis, has larger fruiting bodies, and smaller spores, as well having an olive-greenish tint and a larger, flatter bulb. Cortinarius humolens is also found with holly oak rather than the small-leaved linden. The cap of Cortinarius langeorum is stained dark red by KOH, and its gills are gray rather than yellow, which distinguishes it from Calonarius osloensis.
