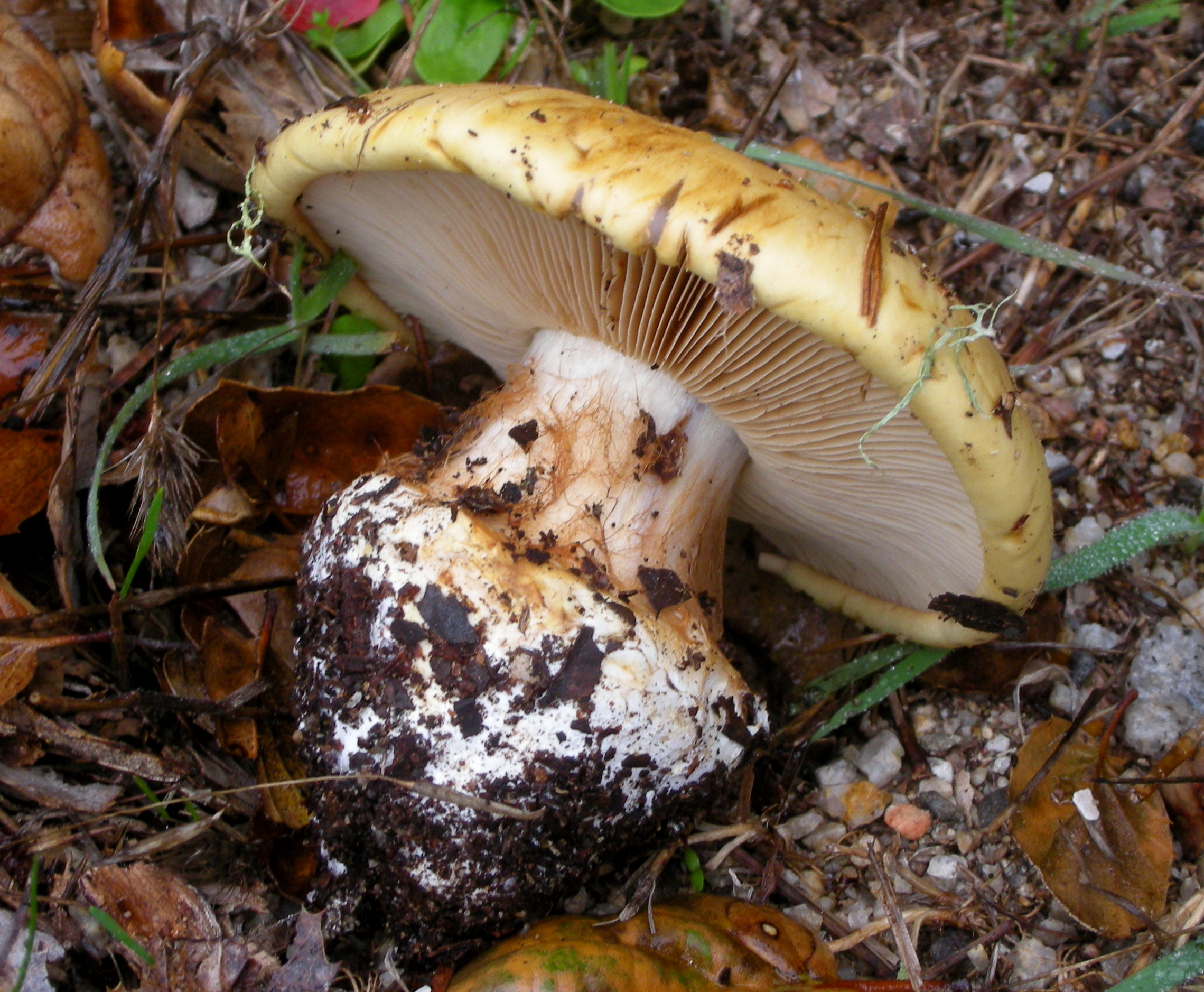

Scientific classification
- Kingdom: Fungi
- Division: Basidiomycota
- Class: Agaricomycetes
- Order: Agaricales
- Family: Cortinariaceae
- Genus: Calonarius
- Species: C. xanthodryophilus

Binomial name
- Calonarius xanthodryophilus (Bojantchev & R.M. Davis) Niskanen & Liimat. (2022)

Synonyms
- Cortinarius xanthodryophilus Bojantchev & R.M. Davis (2011)

= Calonarius xanthodryophilus =

Species of fungus

Calonarius xanthodryophilus is a species of fungus in the family Cortinariaceae.

== Taxonomy ==
The species was described in 2011 by the mycologists Dimitar Bojantchev and R. Michael Davis who classified it as Cortinarius xanthodryophilus.

In 2022 the species was transferred from Cortinarius and reclassified as Calonarius xanthodryophilus based on genomic data.

== Description ==
The mushroom cap is 6–10 cm (2.5–4 in) wide, convex then flat or uplifted, and yellow then yellow-brown. The gills are notched, crowded, yellow then brown as the spores mature. The stalk is 5–10 cm tall and 1.5–3 cm wide, club-shaped, and sometimes tinted blue.

It should not be consumed due to its similarity to deadly poisonous species.

== Habitat and distribution ==
It is native to North America.

== See also ==
- List of Cortinarius species
