= List of deadly mushroom species =

Although many people have a fear of mushroom poisoning by "toadstools", only a small number of the many macroscopic fruiting bodies commonly known as mushrooms and toadstools have proven fatal to humans.

This list is not exhaustive and does not contain many fungi that, although not deadly, are still harmful. For a less-detailed list of fungi that include non-deadly poisonous species, see List of poisonous fungi.

== Fungi with significant risk of death if consumed ==
Scientific name	Common name	Active Agent	Toxicity	Habitat	Similar edible species	Picture
Amanita amerivirosa Tulloss R.E, Kudzma L.V., Tulloss M.A., Rockefeller A.	Destroying angel	amanitins	liver	Woodland eastern North America; Mediterranean	Leucocoprinus leucothites; Agaricus spp.	
Amanita arocheae Tulloss, Ovrebo & Halling	Latin American death cap	amanitins	liver	Woodland (oak); Mexico	Volvariella volvacea; Amanita vaginata; Amanita fulva	
Amanita bisporigera G. F. Atk.	Eastern destroying angel	amanitins	liver	Woodland (pine and oak); Eastern North America	Agaricus silvicola; Volvariella volvacea	
Amanita exitialis Zhu L. Yang & T.H. Li	Guangzhou destroying angel	amanitins	liver	Deciduous woodland Guangdong province, China; India		
Amanita fuliginea Hongo	East Asian brown death cap	amanitins	liver	Woodland; China		
Amanita magnivelaris Peck	Great felt skirt destroying angel	amanitins	liver	Americas		
Amanita ocreata Peck	Western destroying angel	amanitins	liver	Woodland (oak); Pacific Northwest; North America		
Amanita phalloides (Vaill. ex Fr.) Link	Death cap	amanitins	liver	Woodland (various); Europe, North Africa, North America, Australia (SE), New Zealand	Volvariella volvacea; Russula virescens; Amanita lanei; Tricholoma equestre; Agaricus campestris	
Amanita smithiana Bas	Smith's lepidella	2-amino-4,5-hexadienoic acid and possibly other toxic npAAs	liver & kidney	Woodland; Japan and Pacific Northwest		
Amanita sphaerobulbosa Hongo	Asian abrupt-bulbed Lepidella	2-amino-4,5-hexadienoic acid and possibly other toxic npAAs	liver & kidney	Mixed woodlands, eastern Asia		
Amanita subpallidorosea Qing Cai, Zhu L. Yang & Y.Y. Cui		amanitins	liver	Woodland; China		
Amanita subjunquillea S. Imai	East Asian death cap	amanitins	liver	Woodland; East and Southeast Asia, Japan, India		
Amanita verna (Bull.: Fr.) Lam.	Fool's mushroom	amanitins	liver	Woodland (various); Europe	Agaricus arvensis Agaricus campestris Lycoperdon spp.	
Amanita virosa (Fr.) Bertillon	European destroying angel	amanitins	liver	Woodland (various); Europe	Agaricus arvensis Agaricus campestris Lycoperdon spp.	
Calonarius splendens Rob. Henry	Splendid webcap, yellow clubbed foot	orellanine	kidney			
Conocybe rugosa (Peck) Singer more commonly known as Conocybe filaris		amanitins	liver	grassland, lawns, rich soil and compost North America, Europe and Asia	Psilocybe spp.	
Claviceps purpurea	Ergot	ergot alkaloids	multiple	grass		
Clitocybe dealbata (Sowerby) Gillet	Ivory funnel	muscarine	CNS	grassland Europe, North America	Marasmius oreades Clitopilus prunulus	
Clitocybe rivulosa (Pers.) P. Kumm.	False champignon	muscarine	CNS	grassland Europe, North America	Marasmius oreades Clitopilus prunulus	
Cortinarius orellanus Fries	Fool's webcap	orellanine	kidney	Coniferous woodland Northern Europe		
Cortinarius rubellus Cooke	Deadly webcap	orellanine	kidney	Coniferous woodland Northern Europe		
Cortinarius eartoxicus Gasparini	Deadly webcap	orellanine	kidney	Tasman Peninsula, Tasmania		
Galerina marginata (Batsch) Kühner	Autumn skullcap	amanitins	liver	worldwide	Kuehneromyces mutabilis	
Galerina sulciceps (Batsch) Kühner	Toadstool	amanitins	liver	Indonesia		
Gyromitra esculenta (Pers. ex Pers.) Fr.	False morel	gyromitrin and monomethylhydrazine	multiple (depletes PLP stores)	Coniferous woodlands in the Northern Hemisphere	Morchella spp.	
Inosperma erubescens (A. Blytt) Matheny & Esteve-Rav.	Red-staining inocybe (prev. I. patouillardii)	muscarine	CNS	Deciduous woodland (beech); Europe	Calocybe gambosa Agaricus spp. Cortinarius caperatus	
Lepiota brunneoincarnata Chodat & C. Martín	Deadly dapperling	amanitins	liver	Coniferous woodland Europe	Tricholoma terreum; Marasmius oreades	
Lepiota brunneolilacea Bon & Boiffard	Star dapperling	amanitins	liver	Sand dunes of Western Europe		
Lepiota castanea Quél	Chestnut dapperling	amanitins	liver	Coniferous woodland Europe		
Lepiota helveola Bres.		amanitins	liver	Coniferous woodlands of Europe		
Lepiota subincarnata	Deadly parasol	amanitins	liver	Asia, Europe, and North America		
Trichoderma cornu-damae	Poison fire coral	satratoxin-H	bone marrow, brain and skin	Japan, South Korea, Papua New Guinea, Australia	Ganoderma	
Paxillus involutus (Batsch ex Fr.) Fr.	Brown roll-rim	unknown, possibly glycoprotein antigen	extreme autoimmune reaction with hemolysis	Europe and North America		
Trogia venenata Zhu L.Yang, Y.C.Li & L.P.Tang	Little White	(2S,4R)‐2‐amino‐4‐hydroxyhex‐5‐ynoic acid	cardiac arrhythmia and hypoglycemia (Yunnan sudden death syndrome)	Yunnan, China	white Pleurotus	

== Fungi where isolated deaths have been reported ==
Scientific name	Common name	Active Agent	Toxicity	Habitat	Similar edible species	Picture
Amanita muscaria	Fly agaric	Muscimol	CNS	Northern hemisphere, coniferous and deciduous woodland	Lycoperdon spp.; Calvatia spp.; Amanita caesarea	
Rubroboletus pulcherrimus Fr.	Red-pored bolete	unknown	severe gastrointestinal	Woodland; Western North America	Boletus edulis Neoboletus luridiformis	
Chlorophyllum molybdites	Green spored parasol	unknown	severe gastrointestinal	Worldwide (rare in Europe)	Chlorophyllum rhacodes; Coprinus comatus; Macrolepiota procera	
Entoloma sinuatum (Bull.) P. Kumm.	Livid pinkgill	unknown	severe gastrointestinal	Deciduous woodland North America, Europe	Clitopilus prunulus Calocybe gambosa Entoloma abortivum	
Hypholoma fasciculare (Huds.:Fr.) P. Kumm.	Sulfur tuft	Fasciculol F and E	severe gastrointestinal	Woodland; Western North America	Armillaria mellea Hypholoma capnoides	
Lactarius torminosus (Schaeff.) Gray	Woolly milk-cap	unknown	severe gastrointestinal	Woodland; Northern Europe	Lactarius deliciosus	
Omphalotus illudens (Schwein.) Bresinsky & Besl	Jack-o'lantern mushroom	Illudins M and S, Muscarine	severe cramps, vomiting, and diarrhea	North America	Cantharellus californicus	
Omphalotus japonicus (Kawam.) Kirchm. & O.K.Mill. (2002)	Jack-o'lantern mushroom	Illudins M and S, Muscarine	severe cramps, vomiting, and diarrhea	Japan	Pleurotus ostreatus Lentinula edodes Panellus serotinus	
Pleurocybella porrigens	Angel Wings	Pleurocybellaziridin	neurotoxic	Woodland (various); North America, Europe and Asia	Pleurotus pulmonarius	
Russula subnigricans Hongo	Nisekurohatsu	cycloprop-2-ene carboxylic acid	rhabdomyolysis	worldwide		
Tricholoma equestre (L.) P. Kumm.	Yellow knight, man-on-horseback	possibly cycloprop-2-ene carboxylic acid?	rhabdomyolysis	worldwide		

== See also ==
- List of poisonous mushroom species
- Mycotoxicology
