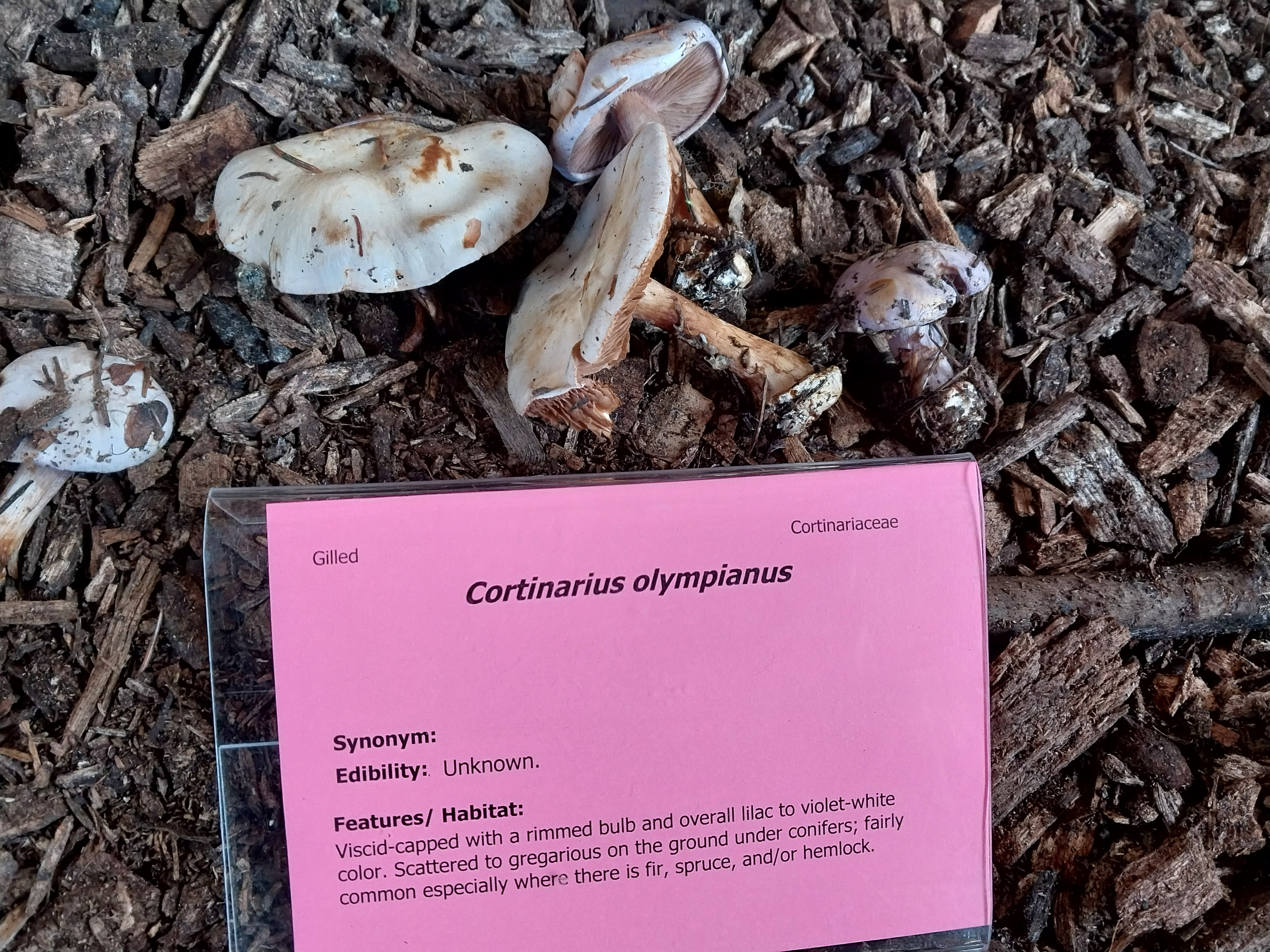

Scientific classification
- Kingdom: Fungi
- Division: Basidiomycota
- Class: Agaricomycetes
- Order: Agaricales
- Family: Cortinariaceae
- Genus: Calonarius
- Species: C. olympianus

Binomial name
- Calonarius olympianus A.H. Sm. Niskanen and Liimat.

Synonyms
- Cortinarius olympianus A.H. Sm.

= Calonarius olympianus =

Species of fungus

Calonarius olympianus Mycological characteristics
- Gills on hymenium
- Cap is convex or flat
- Hymenium is adnate
- Stipe has a cortina
- Spore print is reddish-brown
- Ecology is mycorrhizal
- Edibility is unknown

Calonarius olympianus, formerly known as Cortinarius olympianus and commonly known as the olympic webcap, is a species of mushroom in the family Cortinariaceae.

== Description ==
The cap of Calonarius olympianus is starts out light purple in color, before becoming whitish or sometimes yellowish as the mushroom gets older. It starts out round or convex and becomes flat when the mushroom matures. It is about 3-7 centimeters in diameter. The gills are adnexed to notched. The stipe is about 4-7 centimeters long, 1.1-2 centimeters wide, and purplish in color. A cortina is present, and the spore print is rusty brown. The cap turns pink when potassium hydroxide is applied.

== Habitat and ecology ==
Calonarius olympianus is found in Western North America, where it grows in mature and old-growth forests. It is mycorrhizal, forming a symbiotic relationship with conifer trees.
