= Amanita pallidorosea =

Scientific classification
- Domain: Eukaryota
- Kingdom: Fungi
- Division: Basidiomycota
- Class: Agaricomycetes
- Order: Agaricales
- Family: Amanitaceae
- Genus: Amanita
- Species: A. pallidorosea

Binomial name
- Amanita pallidorosea P. Zhang & Zhu L. Yang

Species of fungus

Amanita pallidorosea is a deadly poisonous mushroom of the large genus Amanita, closely related to A. bisporigera (the destroying angel). It occurs in China under beech trees.

== See also ==
- List of Amanita species
- List of deadly fungi
