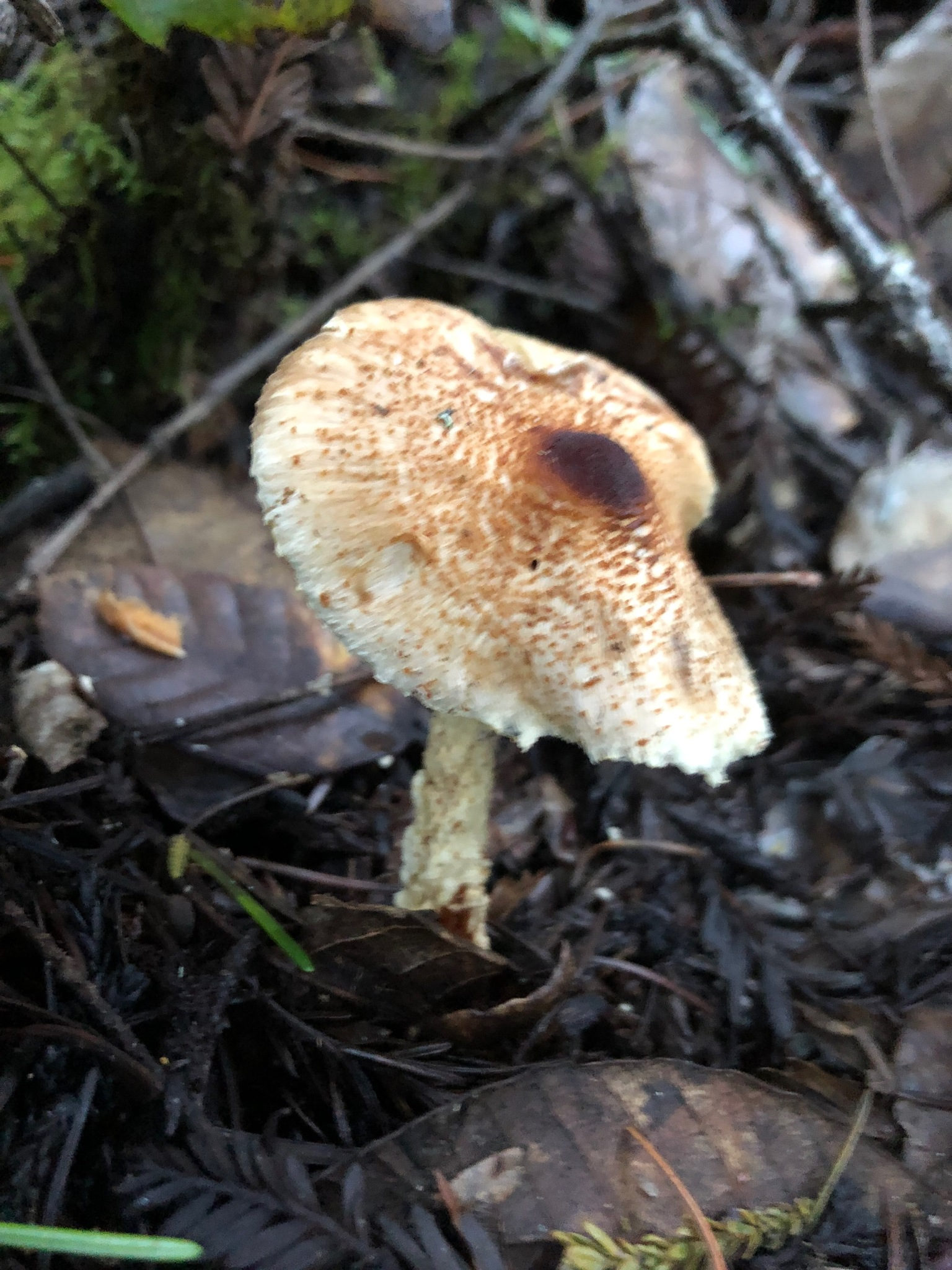

Scientific classification
- Kingdom: Fungi
- Division: Basidiomycota
- Class: Agaricomycetes
- Order: Agaricales
- Family: Agaricaceae
- Genus: Lepiota
- Species: L. magnispora

Binomial name
- Lepiota magnispora Murrill

Synonyms
- Lepiota ventriosospora Ried

= Lepiota magnispora =

Lepiota magnispora, commonly known as the fluffstem parasol or yellowfoot dapperling, is a species of mushroom in the genus Lepiota. It was first described by William Murrill in 1912.

== Description ==
The cap of Lepiota magnispora is around 1.5 to 6 centimeters across. It starts out round to egg-shaped, before becoming flatter with age. The cap is dry, smooth when young, and develops scales as the mushroom gets older. The stipe is 5-12 centimeters long and 0.6-1.5 centimeters wide. It is shaggy towards the base and often has a ring which can disappear with age. The gills are white, and become brownish as the mushroom gets older. The spore print is white.

=== Similar species ===
Lepiota magnispora is morphologically very similar to L. clypeolaria, and was previously considered to be the same species. However, the former is more brightly colored and has larger spores. L. cristata is also similar, but its scales are more pale, and it has an odor described as "unpleasant" and "rubbery." L. ingivolvata has an orange to reddish brown second ring near the base of the stipe.

== Habitat and ecology ==
Lepiota magnispora is saprotrophic and found in a wide variety of habitats, growing under both hardwoods and conifers, including western redcedar. It is found in North America, but its distribution on the continent is not fully known due to similar species.

Lepiota magnispora
- Mycological characteristics
- Gills on hymenium
- Cap is ovate or flat
- Hymenium is free
- Stipe has a ring or is bare
- Spore print is white
- Edibility is inedible
