= Russula subnigricans =

Scientific classification
- Kingdom: Fungi
- Division: Basidiomycota
- Class: Agaricomycetes
- Order: Russulales
- Family: Russulaceae
- Genus: Russula
- Species: R. subnigricans

Binomial name
- Russula subnigricans Hongo (1955)

Russula subnigricans
- Mycological characteristics
- Gills on hymenium
- Cap is convex
- Hymenium is free
- Stipe is bare
- Spore print is white
- Ecology is mycorrhizal
- Edibility is poisonous or deadly

Russula subnigricans, known as the rank russula, or Nise-Kurohatsu (Japanese), meaning "false blackening russula" is a basidiomycete mushroom of the genus Russula found in East Asia. It is poisonous.

== Taxonomy ==
The species was named by Japanese mycologist Tsuguo Hongo in 1955.

The name was formerly applied to the North American fungus Russula eccentrica in California. It has been reclassified as Russula cantharellicola, where it grows in association with Quercus agrifolia (coast live oak) trees in California oak woodland habitats.

== Description ==
The flesh turns pale red when cut, but does not turn black, unlike Russula nigricans.

== Toxicity ==
Russula subnigricans is a poisonous mushroom, and has been responsible for mushroom poisoning in Taiwan and Japan. The effect is a serious one, rhabdomyolysis.

The toxins responsible are the very unusual cycloprop-2-ene carboxylic acid (a toxic molecule consisting of only 10 atoms) and Russuphelin A (a heavily chlorinated polyphenolic).

== See also ==
- List of deadly fungi
- List of Russula species
