= Calonarius flavipallens =

Scientific classification
- Domain: Eukaryota
- Kingdom: Fungi
- Division: Basidiomycota
- Class: Agaricomycetes
- Order: Agaricales
- Family: Cortinariaceae
- Genus: Calonarius
- Species: C. flavipallens

Binomial name
- Calonarius flavipallens (Kytöv., Liimat. & Niskanen) Niskanen & Liimat. (2022)

Synonyms
- Cortinarius flavipallens Kytöv., Liimat. & Niskanen (2014)

Species of fungus

Calonarius flavipallens is a species of agaric fungus in the family Cortinariaceae. Found in Finland, it was described as a new species in 2014.

== Taxonomy ==
It was originally described in 2014 by the mycologists Ilkka Kytövuori, Kare Liimatainen and Tuula Niskanen who classified it as Cortinarius flavipallens. It was placed in the (subgenus Phlegmacium) of the large mushroom-forming fungal genus Cortinarius. The specific epithet flavipallens refers to its pale ochre cap colours.

In 2022 the species was transferred from Cortinarius and reclassified as Calonarius flavipallens based on genomic data.

== Description ==
The fruiting body of Cortinarius flavipallens produces mushrooms with caps (pilei) that typically measure 4 to 8 cm across. The cap shape is initially hemispherical to convex, but it soon flattens out as the mushroom matures. The cap colour ranges from pale ochre to pale brown. Beneath the cap, the gills (lamellae) are crowded, slightly indented where they attach to the stipe (emarginate), and have a pale grey to pale greyish-brown colour.

The stipe measures between 4 and 6 cm in length, with a thickness of 1–1.5 cm at the top, expanding to 2–2.5 cm at the base, which has a distinctly edged (marginate) bulb. The stipe itself is white. Remnants of a universal veil—a membrane covering the mushroom when very young—can be seen as whitish or pale brown fragments around the bulb margin. Internally, the flesh (context) of the mushroom is white, and the mushroom does not have a distinct odour. When potassium hydroxide solution (KOH), a common chemical reagent, is applied, it causes a red colour reaction on the cap surface and bulb margin. In contrast, it induces a slow or weak pinkish-violet (vinaceous pink) colour change on the fuzzy basal covering (tomentum) and the thread-like strands (rhizomorphs) at the base. When dried (in herbarium specimens), the caps become pale ochre to ochre-brown, darkest at the centre and gradually paler towards the edges, while the stem appears greyish-white to pale brown.

Under microscopic examination, the spores of C. flavipallens measure roughly 10.3–11.0 by 5.9–6.1 μm on average and appear almond- to lemon-shaped, tapering slightly towards the apex with a shallow indentation above the spore attachment point (suprahilar depression). The surface of the spores is moderately roughened (verrucose), with small bumps (warts) that occasionally merge (anastomose). Spores show a mild to moderate reddish-brown colouration when stained with iodine solutions (dextrinoid reaction). The spore-bearing cells (basidia) measure 26–38 by 8–10 μm, are club-shaped (clavate), contain four spores each, and appear pale yellowish. The internal structure of the gills (lamellar trama) consists of pale yellowish, smooth hyphae—thread-like fungal cells—some of which contain oily droplets (guttulate) and colourless crystals scattered individually or grouped in small rounded clusters.

The outer layer of the cap (pileipellis) is distinctly gelatinous, composed of pale ochre hyphae that are 3–5 μm wide, smooth or very finely and densely spirally encrusted, giving them a textured appearance. Further down, the hyphae may become slightly broader, are strongly encrusted, and often occur in bundled arrangements. This mushroom lacks a distinct sub-layer (hypoderm) beneath the gelatinous outer layer. Treatment with KOH causes the gelatinous hyphae to turn pale vinaceous pink.

== Habitat and distribution ==
Calonarius flavipallens is found in Picea abies-dominated boreal forest in Finland.

== See also ==
- List of Cortinarius species
