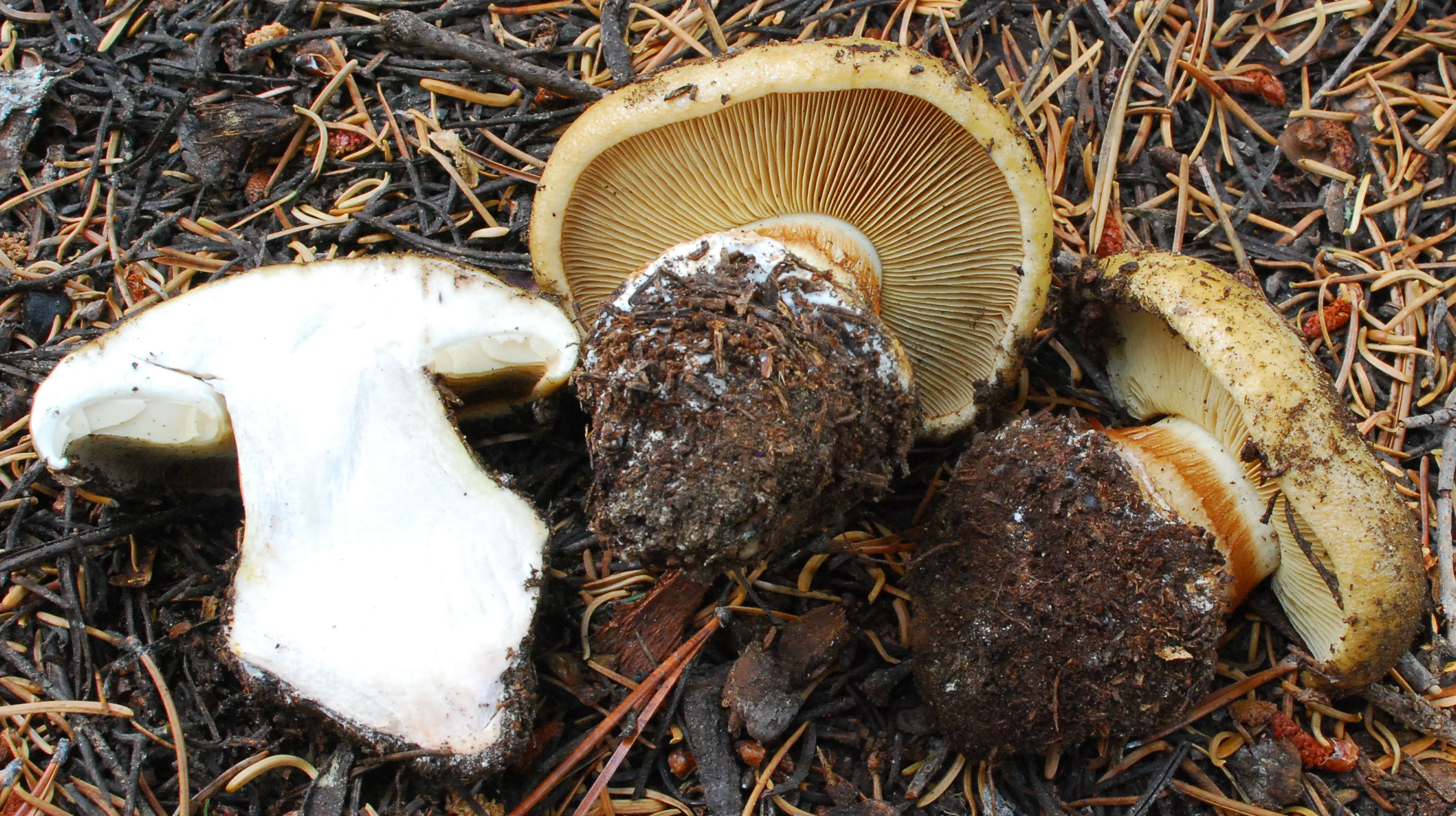

Conservation status
- Vulnerable (IUCN 3.1)

Scientific classification
- Kingdom: Fungi
- Division: Basidiomycota
- Class: Agaricomycetes
- Order: Agaricales
- Family: Cortinariaceae
- Genus: Calonarius
- Species: C. luteicolor

Binomial name
- Calonarius luteicolor (Ammirati, Bojantchev, Niskanen & Liimat.) Niskanen & Liimat. (2022)

Synonyms
- Cortinarius orichalceus var. olympianus f. luteifolius A.H.Sm. (1944); Cortinarius luteicolor Ammirati, Bojantchev, Niskanen & Liimat. (2014)

= Calonarius luteicolor =

Species of fungus

Calonarius luteicolor is a species of fungus in the family Cortinariaceae.

== Taxonomy ==
It was described as new to science in 1944 by American mycologist Alexander H. Smith, who called it Cortinarius orichalceus var. olympianus f. luteifolius.

Molecular analysis of the internal transcribed spacer DNA regions demonstrated that this taxon was sufficiently distinct genetically to warrant designation as a species, and it was renamed in 2014 and placed in subgenus Phlegmacium of the Cortinarius genus.

In 2022 the species was transferred from Cortinarius and reclassified as Calonarius luteicolor based on genomic data.

== Etymology ==
The specific epithet luteicolor refers to yellowish colors of the cap and gills.

== Habitat and distribution ==
The mushroom is found in the Pacific Northwest region of the United States, and British Columbia in Canada.

== See also ==
- List of Cortinarius species
