= Leucocoprinus bulbipes =

Scientific classification
- Domain: Eukaryota
- Kingdom: Fungi
- Division: Basidiomycota
- Class: Agaricomycetes
- Order: Agaricales
- Family: Agaricaceae
- Genus: Leucocoprinus
- Species: L. bulbipes

Binomial name
- Leucocoprinus bulbipes Raithelh. (1987)

Synonyms
- Agaricus bulbipes Mont. (1856); Lepiota bulbipes Sacc. (1887); Mastocephalus bulbipes Kuntze (1891); Chamaeceras bulbipes Kuntze (1898)

Species of fungus

Leucocoprinus bulbipes Mycological characteristics
- Gills on hymenium
- Cap is campanulate or convex
- Hymenium is free
- Stipe has a ring
- Spore print is white
- Ecology is saprotrophic
- Edibility is unknown

Leucocoprinus bulbipes is a species of mushroom producing fungus in the family Agaricaceae.

== Taxonomy ==
It was described in 1856 by the French mycologist Jean Pierre François Camille Montagne who classified it as Agricus (Lepiota) bulbipes. Montagne's description was based upon specimens collected by Hugh Algernon Weddell on his expeditions in South America.

In 1887 it was reclassified as Lepiota bulbipes by the Italian mycologist Pier Andrea Saccardo and then as Mastocephalus bulbipes in 1891 by the German botanist Otto Kunze, however Kunze's Mastocephalus genus, along with most of 'Revisio generum plantarum' was not widely accepted by the scientific community of the age so it remained a Lepiota. Likewise Kunze's later classification as Chamaeceras bulbipes was not accepted.

In 1987 it was reclassified as Leucocoprinus bulbipes by the mycologist Jörg Raithelhuber.

Raithelhuber also notes that Lepiota cinerascens as described by Carlo Luigi Spegazzini in 1898 may be a synonym however this name was invalid as it had already been used by Lucien Quélet in 1894 and so the species Spegazzini described was reclassified as Lepiota spegazzinii in 1912.

== Description ==
Leucocoprinus bulbipes is a small dapperling mushroom.

Cap: 3–4 cm wide starting campanulate before spreading out to convex. The surface is pale with a black or blackish-brown centre disc and striations running from the edges of the cap. It is fibrous and noted as being 'somewhat fleshier' than other Leucocoprinus species. Gills: Pale, free and close sometimes with denticulate edges. Stem: 7–8 cm long and almost cylindrical but with a bulbous base. The surface is whitish and powdery and the ring is persistent but slender. Spores: Oval with a somewhat thick wall and indistinct germ pore. 10.2-12.6 x 7–8.4μm.

In Montagne's description of the species he notes grey radial striations and a reddish brown (rufescente) centre.

== Habitat and distribution ==
The specimens studied by Montagne were found growing on the ground amongst rotting leaves in the humid forests of Goiás, Brazil during November.

The specimens studied by Raithelhuber were found growing in forests in Brazil.

== Similar species ==
Raithelhuber notes that Lepiota brebissonii (now Leucocoprinus brebissonii) is similar but has narrower spores and a different cap shape. The spore size is also very similar to that of Leucocoprinus inflatus which Raithelhuber notes may just be a variety of L. bulbipes.
