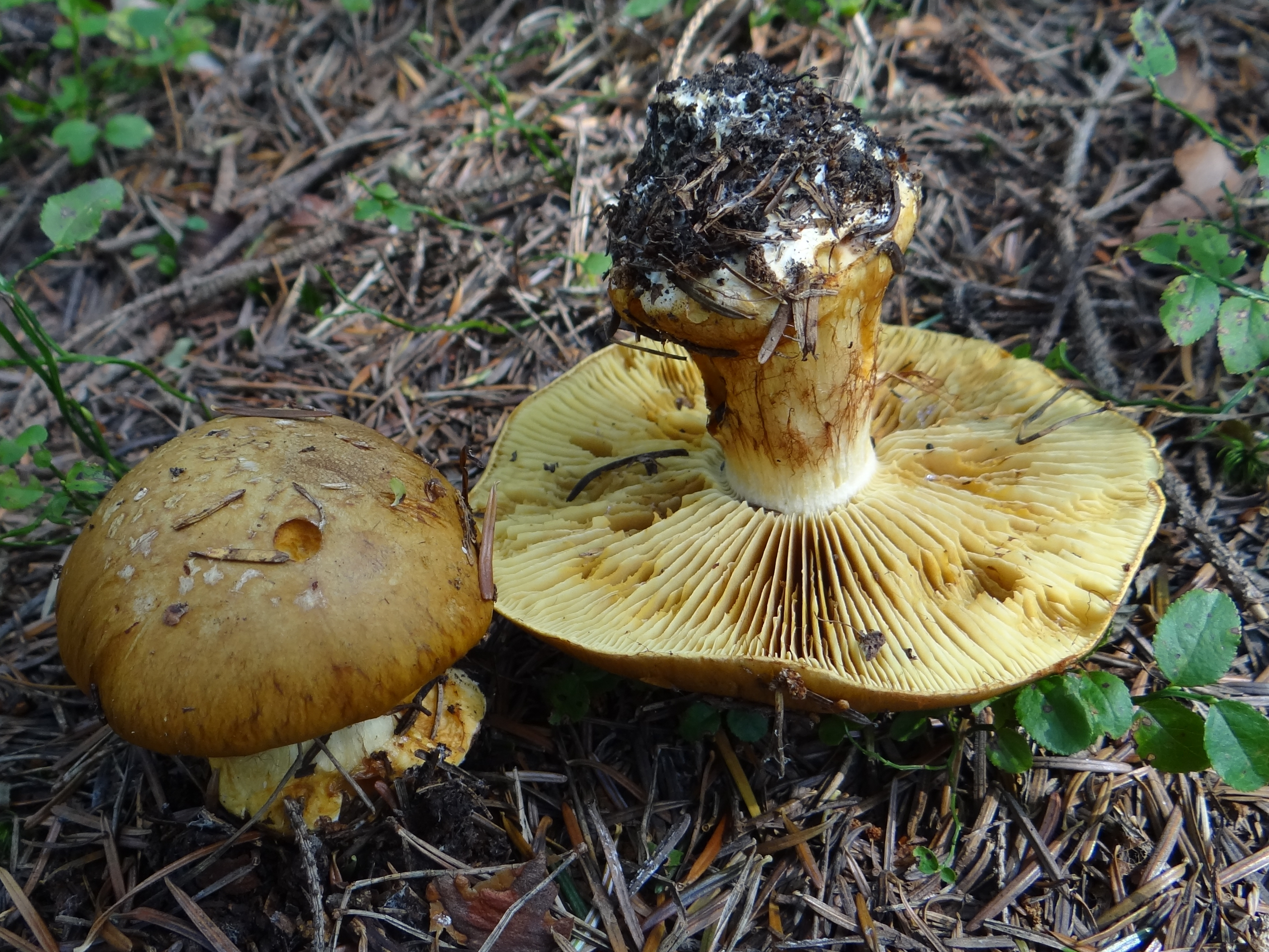
- Calonarius elegantior

Scientific classification
- Kingdom: Fungi
- Division: Basidiomycota
- Class: Agaricomycetes
- Order: Agaricales
- Family: Cortinariaceae
- Genus: Calonarius; Niskanen & Liimat. (2022)

Type species
- Calonarius typicus (Liimat.) Niskanen (2022)

= Calonarius =

Genus of fungi

Calonarius is a genus of fungi in the family Cortinariaceae.

== Taxonomy ==
The genus was created in 2022 when the family Cortinariaceae, which previously in then-recent phylogenetic studies contained only the one genus of Cortinarius, (Note: Cortinariaceae also contains Stephanopus, whose position remains to be uncovered as Stephanopus species have no DNA data yet.) was reclassified based on genomic data and split into the genera of Cortinarius, Aureonarius, Austrocortinarius, Calonarius, Cystinarius, Hygronarius, Mystinarius, Phlegmacium, Thaxterogaster and Volvanarius.

The genus is further divided with subgenus and section classifications:

- Calonarius subgenus Calonarius includes the sections: Calonarius, Humolentes and Rufoolivacei.
- Calonarius subgenus Calochroi includes the sections: Calochroi, Nymphicolores, Platypodes and Sodagniti.
- Calonarius subgenus Fulvi includes the sections: Fulvi, Atrovirentes, Aureopulverulenti, Dibaphi and Splendentes.

== Etymology ==
The name Calonarius derives from the combination of the genus name Cortinarius and the section name Calochroi in which these species were placed prior to the reclassification.

== Species ==
As of January 2023, Species Fungorum accepted 133 species of Calonarius.

1. Calonarius adonis (Bojantchev & Ammirati) Niskanen & Liimat. (2022)
2. Calonarius albertii (Dima, Frøslev & T.S. Jeppesen) Niskanen & Liimat. (2022)
3. Calonarius albidolilacinus (Ammirati, Bojantchev, Beug, Liimat., Niskanen & Garnica) Niskanen & Liimat. (2022)
4. Calonarius alcalinophilus (Rob. Henry) Niskanen & Liimat. (2022)
5. Calonarius alnobetulae (Kühner) Niskanen & Liimat. (2022)
6. Calonarius amabilis (Bojantchev, Ammirati & Pastorino) Niskanen & Liimat. (2022)
7. Calonarius amnicola (A.H. Sm.) Niskanen & Liimat. (2022)
8. Calonarius anaunianus (Fellin & R.J. Ferrari) Niskanen & Liimat. (2022)
9. Calonarius anetholens (Ammirati, Garnica, Bojantchev, Beug, Liimat. & Niskanen) Niskanen & Liimat. (2022)
10. Calonarius arcuatorum (Rob. Henry) Niskanen & Liimat. (2022)
11. Calonarius arenicola (A.H. Sm.) Niskanen & Liimat. (2022)
12. Calonarius atrovirens (Kalchbr.) Niskanen & Liimat. (2022)
13. Calonarius aureocalceolatus (M.M. Moser & Peintner) Niskanen & Liimat. (2022)
14. Calonarius aureofulvus (M.M. Moser) Niskanen & Liimat. (2022)
15. Calonarius aureopulverulentus (M.M. Moser) Niskanen & Liimat. (2022)
16. Calonarius aurora (M.M. Moser & Ammirati) Niskanen & Liimat. (2022)
17. Calonarius barbaricus (Brandrud) Niskanen & Liimat. (2022)
18. Calonarius barbarorum (Bidaud, Moënne-Locc. & Reumaux) Niskanen & Liimat. (2022)
19. Calonarius bigelowii (Thiers & A.H. Sm.) Niskanen & Liimat. (2022)
20. Calonarius cacodes (M.M. Moser & Ammirati) Niskanen & Liimat. (2022)
21. Calonarius caesiocinctus (Kühner) Niskanen & Liimat. (2022)
22. Calonarius caesiolatens (Rob. Henry ex Bidaud & Reumaux) Niskanen & Liimat. (2022)
23. Calonarius callochrous (Pers.) Niskanen & Liimat. (2022)
24. Calonarius calojanthinus (M.M. Moser & Ammirati) Niskanen & Liimat. (2022)
25. Calonarius caroviolaceus (P.D. Orton) Niskanen & Liimat. (2022)
26. Calonarius caryae (Lebeuf, A. Paul, J. Landry & Y. Lamoureux) Niskanen & Liimat. (2022)
27. Calonarius catharinae (Consiglio) Niskanen & Liimat. (2022)
28. Calonarius cedretorum (Maire) Niskanen & Liimat. (2022)
29. Calonarius chailluzii (Frøslev & T.S. Jeppesen) Niskanen & Liimat. (2022)
30. Calonarius cisticola (Frøslev & T.S. Jeppesen) Niskanen & Liimat. (2022)
31. Calonarius citrinipedes (A.H. Sm.) Niskanen & Liimat. (2022)
32. Calonarius citrinus (J.E. Lange ex P.D. Orton) Niskanen & Liimat. (2022)
33. Calonarius claroflavus (Rob. Henry) Niskanen & Liimat. (2022)
34. Calonarius cobaltinus (Kytöv., Liimat. & Niskanen) Niskanen & Liimat. (2022)
35. Calonarius coniferarum (M.M. Moser) Niskanen & Liimat. (2022)
36. Calonarius corrosus (Fr.) Niskanen & Liimat. (2022)
37. Calonarius cupreorufus (Brandrud) Niskanen & Liimat. (2022)
38. Calonarius dalecarlicus (Brandrud) Niskanen & Liimat. (2022)
39. Calonarius dibaphus (Fr.) Niskanen & Liimat. (2022)
40. Calonarius elegantiomontanus (Garnica & Ammirati) Niskanen & Liimat. (2022)
41. Calonarius elegantio-occidentalis occidentalis (Garnica & Ammirati) Niskanen & Liimat. (2022)
42. Calonarius elegantior (Fr.) Niskanen & Liimat. (2022)
43. Calonarius elegantissimus (Rob. Henry) Niskanen & Liimat. (2022)
44. Calonarius elotoides (M.M. Moser & McKnight) Niskanen & Liimat. (2022)
45. Calonarius elotus (Fr.) Niskanen & Liimat. (2022)
46. Calonarius evosmus (Joachim ex Bidaud & Reumaux) Niskanen & Liimat. (2022)
47. Calonarius flavaurora (M.M. Moser & McKnight) Niskanen & Liimat. (2022)
48. Calonarius flavipallens (Kytöv., Liimat. & Niskanen) Niskanen & Liimat. (2022)
49. Calonarius flavipavonius S.D. Adams, Bojantchev et al. (2023)
50. Calonarius flavoaurantians (Boccardo, Cleric. & Vizzini) Niskanen & Liimat. (2022)
51. Calonarius flavobulbus (Ammirati & M.M. Moser) Niskanen & Liimat. (2022)
52. Calonarius flavomirus Guinberteau, Armada & Bellanger (2022)
53. Calonarius flavovirens (Rob. Henry) Niskanen & Liimat. (2022)
54. Calonarius frondosophilus (Bidaud) Niskanen & Liimat. (2022)
55. Calonarius fulvoarcuatorum (Garnica & Ammirati) Niskanen & Liimat. (2022)
56. Calonarius fulvocitrinus (Brandrud) Niskanen & Liimat. (2022)
57. Calonarius fulvoincarnatus (Joachim ex Bidaud, Moënne-Locc. & Reumaux) Niskanen & Liimat. (2022)
58. Calonarius glaucescens (Jul. Schäff.) Niskanen & Liimat. (2022)
59. Calonarius glaucoelotus (Brandrud, Dima, Krisai, Ballarà & Peintner) Niskanen & Liimat. (2022)
60. Calonarius haasii (M.M. Moser) Niskanen & Liimat. (2022)
61. Calonarius hildegardiae (Schmidt-Stohn, Brandrud & Dima) Niskanen & Liimat. (2022)
62. Calonarius humolens (Brandrud) Niskanen & Liimat. (2022)
63. Calonarius insignibulbus (Bidaud & Moënne-Locc.) Niskanen & Liimat. (2022)
64. Calonarius intricatus (Bojantchev, Ammirati & N. Siegel) Niskanen & Liimat. (2022)
65. Calonarius ionochlorus (Maire) Niskanen & Liimat. (2022)
66. Calonarius jardinensis (Garnica, Ammirati & Halling) Niskanen & Liimat. (2022)
67. Calonarius juxtadibaphus (Rob. Henry) Niskanen & Liimat. (2022)
68. Calonarius kristiniae (Brandrud) Niskanen & Liimat. (2022)
69. Calonarius laberiae (Münzmay, B. Oertel & Saar) Niskanen & Liimat. (2022)
70. Calonarius langeorum (Frøslev & T.S. Jeppesen) Niskanen & Liimat. (2022)
71. Calonarius lavandulochlorus (Eyssart.) Niskanen & Liimat. (2022)
72. Calonarius lentus (Boccardo, Cleric., Dovana & Vizzini) Niskanen & Liimat. (2022)
73. Calonarius lilacinovelatus (Reumaux & Ramm) Niskanen & Liimat. (2022)
74. Calonarius lilaciotinctus (Garnica & Ammirati) Niskanen & Liimat. (2022)
75. Calonarius luteicolor (Ammirati, Bojantchev, Niskanen & Liimat.) Niskanen & Liimat. (2022)
76. Calonarius luteolus (M.M. Moser) Niskanen & Liimat. (2022)
77. Calonarius mariekristinae (Brandrud & Dima) Niskanen & Liimat. (2022)
78. Calonarius meinhardii (Bon) Niskanen & Liimat. (2022)
79. Calonarius metarius (Kauffman) Niskanen & Liimat. (2022)
80. Calonarius mikedavisii (Bojantchev) Niskanen & Liimat. (2022)
81. Calonarius molochinus (Bidaud & Ramm) Niskanen & Liimat. (2022)
82. Calonarius moseri (E. Horak) Niskanen & Liimat. (2022)
83. Calonarius murellensis (Cors. Gut., Ballarà, Cadiñanos, Palazón & Mahiques) Niskanen & Liimat. (2022)
84. Calonarius napus (Fr.) Niskanen & Liimat. (2022)
85. Calonarius natalis (D. Antonini & M. Antonini) Niskanen & Liimat. (2022)
86. Calonarius nymphicolor (Reumaux) Niskanen & Liimat. (2022)
87. Calonarius ochraceopallescens (Moënne-Locc. & Reumaux) Niskanen & Liimat. (2022)
88. Calonarius odoratus (Joguet ex M.M. Moser) Niskanen & Liimat. (2022)
89. Calonarius odorifer (Britzelm.) Niskanen & Liimat. (2022)
90. Calonarius olearioides (Rob. Henry) Niskanen & Liimat. (2022)
91. Calonarius olivaceolamellatus (Lebeuf, A. Paul & J. Landry) Niskanen & Liimat. (2022)
92. Calonarius oliveopetasatus (M.M. Moser) Niskanen & Liimat. (2022)
93. Calonarius olympianus (A.H. Sm.) Niskanen & Liimat. (2022)
94. Calonarius osloensis (Brandrud, T.S. Jeppesen & Frøslev) Niskanen & Liimat. (2022)
95. Calonarius osmophorus (P.D. Orton) Niskanen & Liimat. (2022)
96. Calonarius parasuaveolens (Bon & Trescol) Niskanen & Liimat. (2022)
97. Calonarius piceae (Frøslev, T.S. Jeppesen & Brandrud) Niskanen & Liimat. (2022)
98. Calonarius platypus (M.M. Moser) Niskanen & Liimat. (2022)
99. Calonarius praetermissus (Bergeron ex Reumaux) Niskanen & Liimat. (2022)
100. Calonarius prasinus (Schaeff.) Niskanen & Liimat. (2022)
101. Calonarius pseudocisticola (Boccardo, Dovana, Dima, L. Albert, Borovička, Mikšík, Saar & Vizzini) Niskanen & Liimat. (2022)
102. Calonarius pseudocupreorufus (Niskanen, Liimat. & Ammirati) Niskanen & Liimat. (2022)
103. Calonarius pseudoglaucopus (Jul. Schäff. ex M.M. Moser) Niskanen & Liimat. (2022)
104. Calonarius pseudoparvus (Bidaud) Niskanen & Liimat. (2022)
105. Calonarius quercilicis (Chevassut & Rob. Henry) Melot (2022)
106. Calonarius rapaceoides (Bidaud, G. Riousset & Riousset) Niskanen & Liimat. (2022)
107. Calonarius rapaceotomentosus (Delaporte & Eyssart.) Niskanen & Liimat. (2022)
108. Calonarius rufo-olivaceus olivaceus (Pers.) Niskanen & Liimat. (2022)
109. Calonarius sancti-felicis felicis (Frøslev & T.S. Jeppesen) Niskanen & Liimat. (2022)
110. Calonarius sannio (M.M. Moser) Niskanen & Liimat. (2022)
111. Calonarius saporatus (Britzelm.) Niskanen & Liimat. (2022)
112. Calonarius saxamontanus (Fogel) Niskanen & Liimat. (2022)
113. Calonarius selandicus (Frøslev & T.S. Jeppesen) Niskanen & Liimat. (2022)
114. Calonarius sodagnitus (Rob. Henry) Niskanen & Liimat. (2022)
115. Calonarius spectabilis (M.M. Moser) Niskanen & Liimat. (2022)
116. Calonarius speculum (Moënne-Locc.) Niskanen & Liimat. (2022)
117. Calonarius splendens (Rob. Henry) Niskanen & Liimat. (2022)
118. Calonarius splendidior (Bidaud) Niskanen & Liimat. (2022)
119. Calonarius splendificus (Chevassut & Rob. Henry) Niskanen & Liimat. (2022)
120. Calonarius suaveolens (Bataille & Joachim) Niskanen & Liimat. (2022)
121. Calonarius subgracilis (Moënne-Locc.) Niskanen & Liimat. (2022)
122. Calonarius sublilacinopes (Bidaud, Moënne-Locc. & Reumaux) Niskanen & Liimat. (2022)
123. Calonarius subpurpureophyllus (A.H. Sm.) Niskanen & Liimat. (2022)
124. Calonarius subsulfurinus (Ammirati, Dima, Liimat., Niskanen & Garnica) Niskanen & Liimat. (2022)
125. Calonarius sulfurinus (Quél.) Niskanen & Liimat. (2022)
126. Calonarius typicus (Liimat.) Niskanen (2022)
127. Calonarius verrucisporus (Thiers & A.H. Sm.) Niskanen & Liimat. (2022)
128. Calonarius vesterholtii (Frøslev & T.S. Jeppesen) Niskanen & Liimat. (2022)
129. Calonarius violaceipes (Bidaud & Consiglio) Niskanen & Liimat. (2022)
130. Calonarius viridicarneus (Lebeuf, A. Paul & J. Landry) Niskanen & Liimat. (2022)
131. Calonarius viridirubescens (M.M. Moser & Ammirati) Niskanen & Liimat. (2022)
132. Calonarius xanthochlorus (Rob. Henry) Niskanen & Liimat. (2022)
133. Calonarius xanthodryophilus (Bojantchev & R.M. Davis) Niskanen & Liimat. (2022)
134. Calonarius xanthophyllus (Cooke) Niskanen & Liimat. (2022)
