= Calonarius flavipavonius =

Scientific classification
- Kingdom: Fungi
- Division: Basidiomycota
- Class: Agaricomycetes
- Order: Agaricales
- Family: Cortinariaceae
- Genus: Calonarius
- Species: C. flavipavonius

Binomial name
- Calonarius flavipavonius S.D. Adams, Bojantchev et al.

Species of fungus

Calonarius flavipavonius
- Mycological characteristics
- Gills on hymenium
- Cap is convex or flat
- Hymenium is adnexed
- Stipe has a cortina
- Ecology is mycorrhizal
- Edibility is unknown

Calonarius flavipavonius, commonly known as the yellow peacock webcap, is a species of mushroom in the family Cortinariaceae. It is rare.

== Description ==
The cap of Calonarius flavipavonius is brownish in color and purplish at the margins. It is convex, and sometimes becomes flat in age. It is slimy when wet and about 5-15 centimeters in diameter. The stipe is about 2.5-6.5 centimeters long and 1.1-2 centimeters wide at the top. It is whitish and can sometimes be yellowish or purplish at the top. A cortina is present. The gills are yellowish to light olive in color and are adnexed.

== Habitat and ecology ==
Calonarius flavipavonius is found under douglas fir, spruce, fir, and hemlock in coniferous forests in Western North America.
