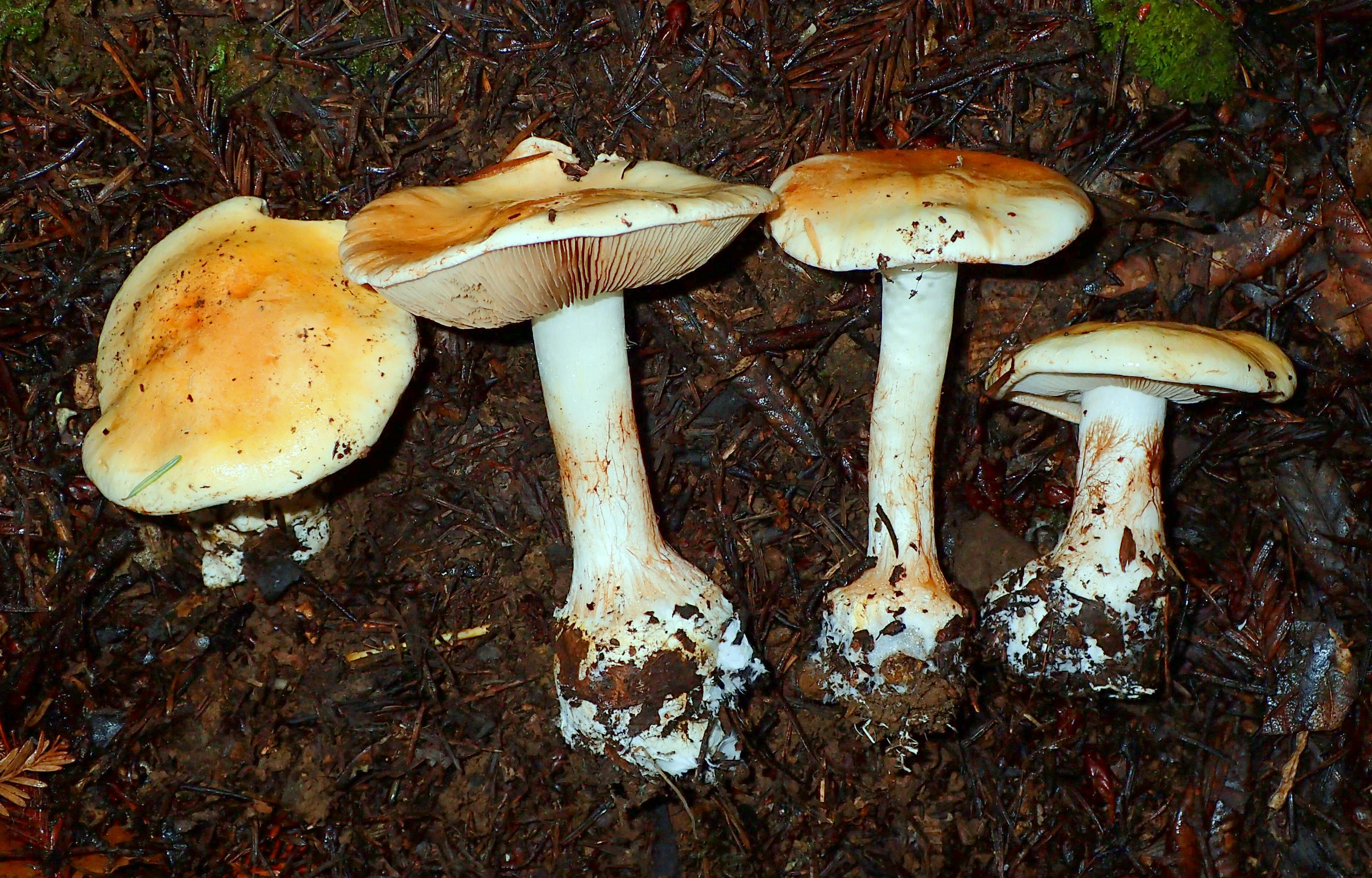

Scientific classification
- Kingdom: Fungi
- Division: Basidiomycota
- Class: Agaricomycetes
- Order: Agaricales
- Family: Cortinariaceae
- Genus: Calonarius
- Species: C. aureofulvus

Binomial name
- Calonarius aureofulvus (M.M. Moser) Niskanen & Liimat. (2022)

Synonyms
- Cortinarius aureofulvus M.M. Moser (1952); Phlegmacium aureofulvum (M.M. Moser) M.M. Moser (1960)

= Calonarius aureofulvus =

Species of fungus

Calonarius aureofulvus is a species of fungus in the family Cortinariaceae.

== Taxonomy ==
It was described by Austrian mycologist Meinhard Michael Moser in 1952 who classified it as Cortinarius aureofulvus and then reclassified it as Phlegmacium aureofulvum in 1960.

In 2022 the species was transferred from Cortinarius and reclassified as Calonarius aureofulvus based on genomic data.

== Habitat and distribution ==
The species is native to Europe.
