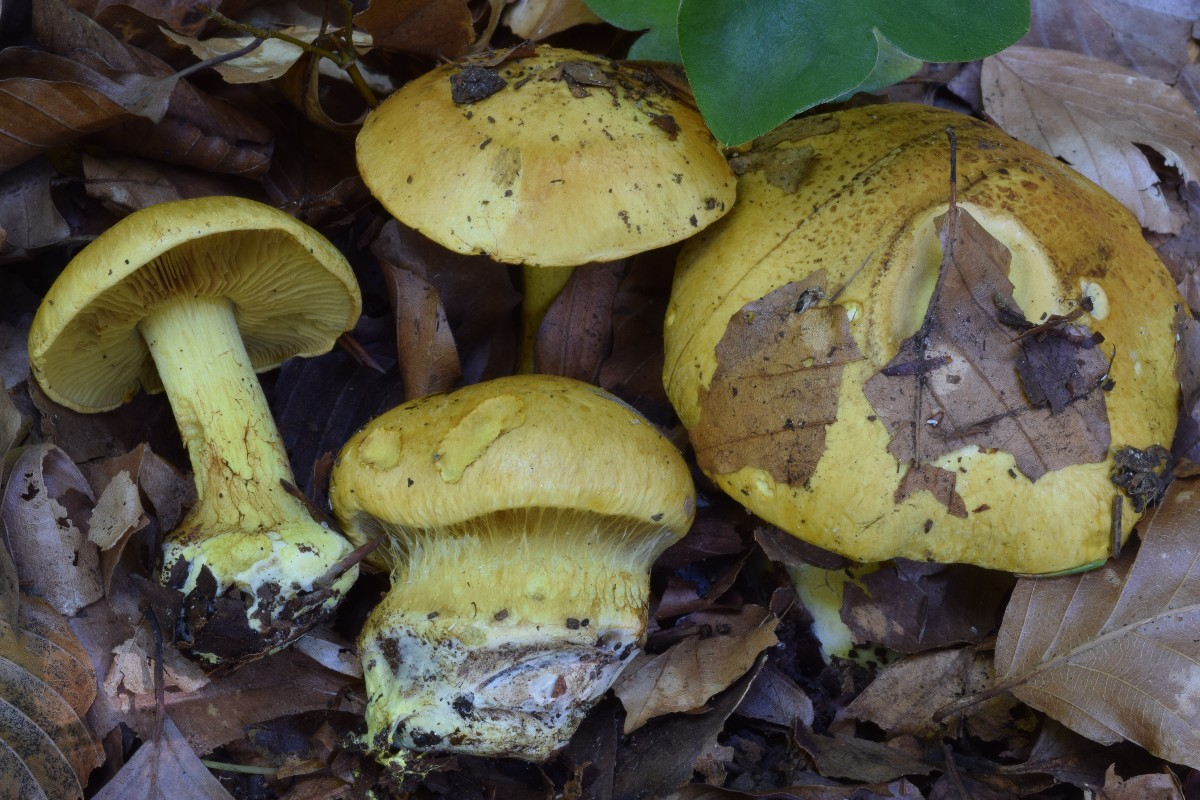

Scientific classification
- Kingdom: Fungi
- Division: Basidiomycota
- Class: Agaricomycetes
- Order: Agaricales
- Family: Cortinariaceae
- Genus: Calonarius
- Species: C. splendens

Binomial name
- Calonarius splendens (Rob. Henry) Niskanen & Liimat. (2022)

Synonyms
- Cortinarius splendens Rob. Henry (1939)

= Calonarius splendens =

Species of fungus

Calonarius splendens
- Mycological characteristics
- Gills on hymenium
- Cap is convex
- Hymenium is emarginate
- Stipe is bare
- Ecology is mycorrhizal
- Edibility is deadly

Calonarius splendens is a species of fungus in the family Cortinariaceae. It is commonly known as the splendid webcap. The species is native to Europe where it has been implicated in poisonings resulting in kidney failure, though with milder symptoms than other deadly webcaps.

== Taxonomy ==
The species was described in 1939 by the mycologist Robert Henry who classified it as Cortinarius splendens.

In 2022 the species was transferred from Cortinarius and reclassified as Calonarius splendens based on genomic data.

== Habitat and distribution ==
It has been classed as conspecific with Cortinarius meinhardii, although the two species have different tree hosts—the former with the European beech (Fagus sylvatica) and the latter with Norway spruce (Picea abies).

== See also ==
- List of Cortinarius species
