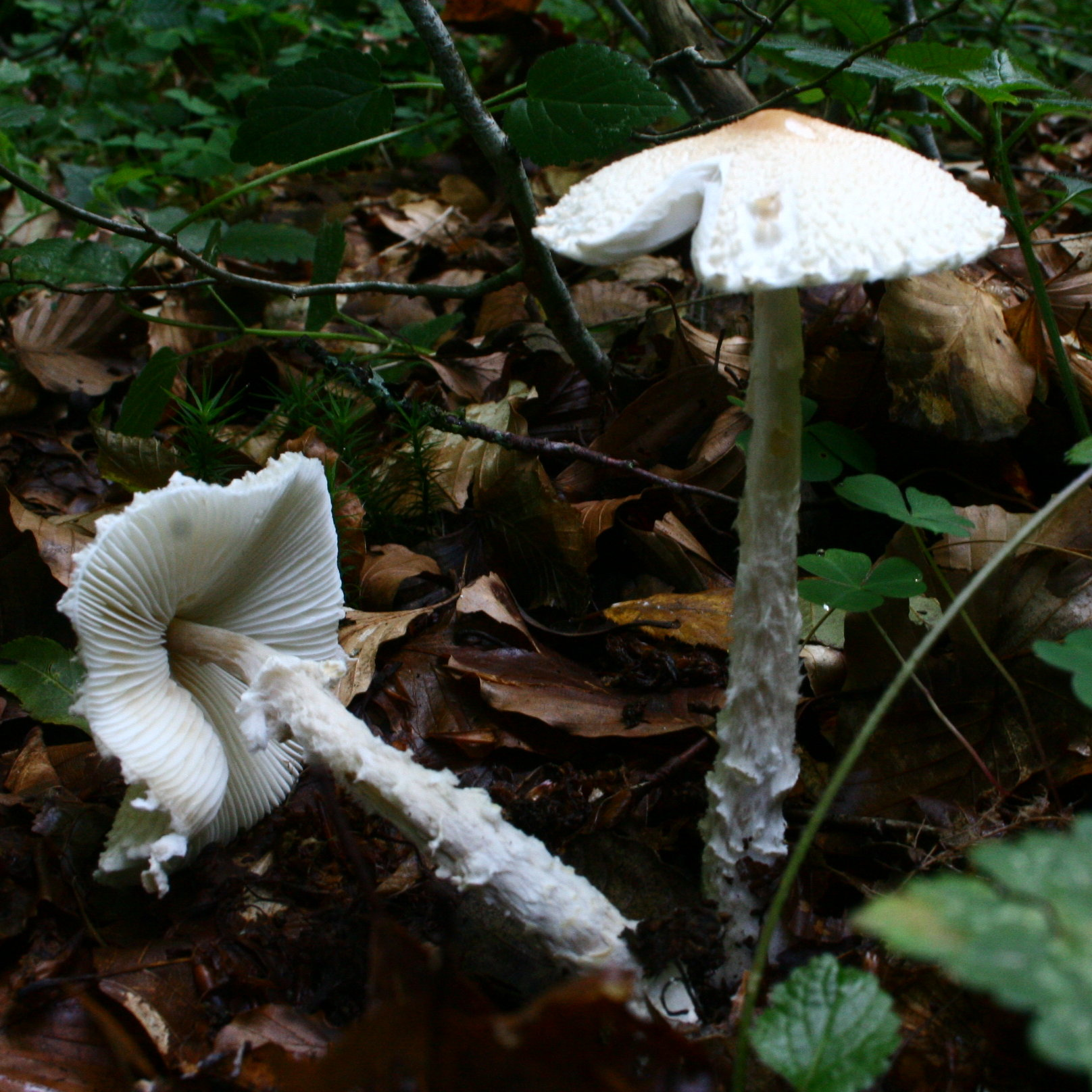

Scientific classification
- Domain: Eukaryota
- Kingdom: Fungi
- Division: Basidiomycota
- Class: Agaricomycetes
- Order: Agaricales
- Family: Agaricaceae
- Genus: Lepiota
- Species: L. clypeolaria

Binomial name
- Lepiota clypeolaria (Bull.) P.Kumm. (1871)

Synonyms
- Lepiota ochraceosulfurescens Locq. ex Bon (1981); Agaricus clypeolarius Bull. (1789)

= Lepiota clypeolaria =

Species of fungus

Lepiota clypeolaria, commonly known as the shield dapperling or the shaggy-stalked Lepiota, is a common species of mushroom in the genus Lepiota. The fruit bodies have a brownish cap, a shaggy stipe with a collapsed, sheathing ring or ring zone, and spindle-shaped spores.

It is widely distributed in northern temperate zones, where it grows in deciduous and coniferous forests.

== Taxonomy ==
The species was first described in 1789 as Agaricus clypeolarius by French mycologist Jean Baptiste Francois Bulliard. Paul Kummer transferred it to Lepiota in 1871. It is commonly known as the "shaggy-stalked Lepiota".

L. clypeolaria is probably the best known of the section Fusisporae within genus Lepiota, whose members are characterized by long spindle-shaped spores and a fluffy stem beneath the ring.

== Description ==
Lepiota clypeolaria Mycological characteristics
- Gills on hymenium
- Cap is campanulate or convex
- Hymenium is free
- Stipe has a ring
- Spore print is white
- Edibility is unknown or poisonous

The cap is egg-shaped when young, soon broadly bell-shaped and has pale straw- or orange-brown scales on a pale background. The central umbo is covered with a well-delimited uniform disk of the same colour as the scales. It grows to a diameter of 4–7 cm (1.6–2.8 in). The gills are white, crowded, free from attachment to the stipe.

The white stem has an indistinct ring, below which it is coarsely woolly, giving an appearance which is sometimes described as "booted". The stipe, which measures 5–12 cm (2.0–4.7 in) long by 0.3–1 cm (0.12–0.39 in) thick, is hollow and slender, expanding slightly at the base into a club shape. The flesh is white and has an unpleasant smell.

The spore print is white. The spores are fuse-shaped (fusiform), meaning that they are tapered at both ends. They have dimensions of 12–16 by 5–6 μm. Cystidia on the gill edge (cheilocystidia) are club-shaped to cylindrical, and measure 20–40 by 5–15 μm.

=== Similar species ===
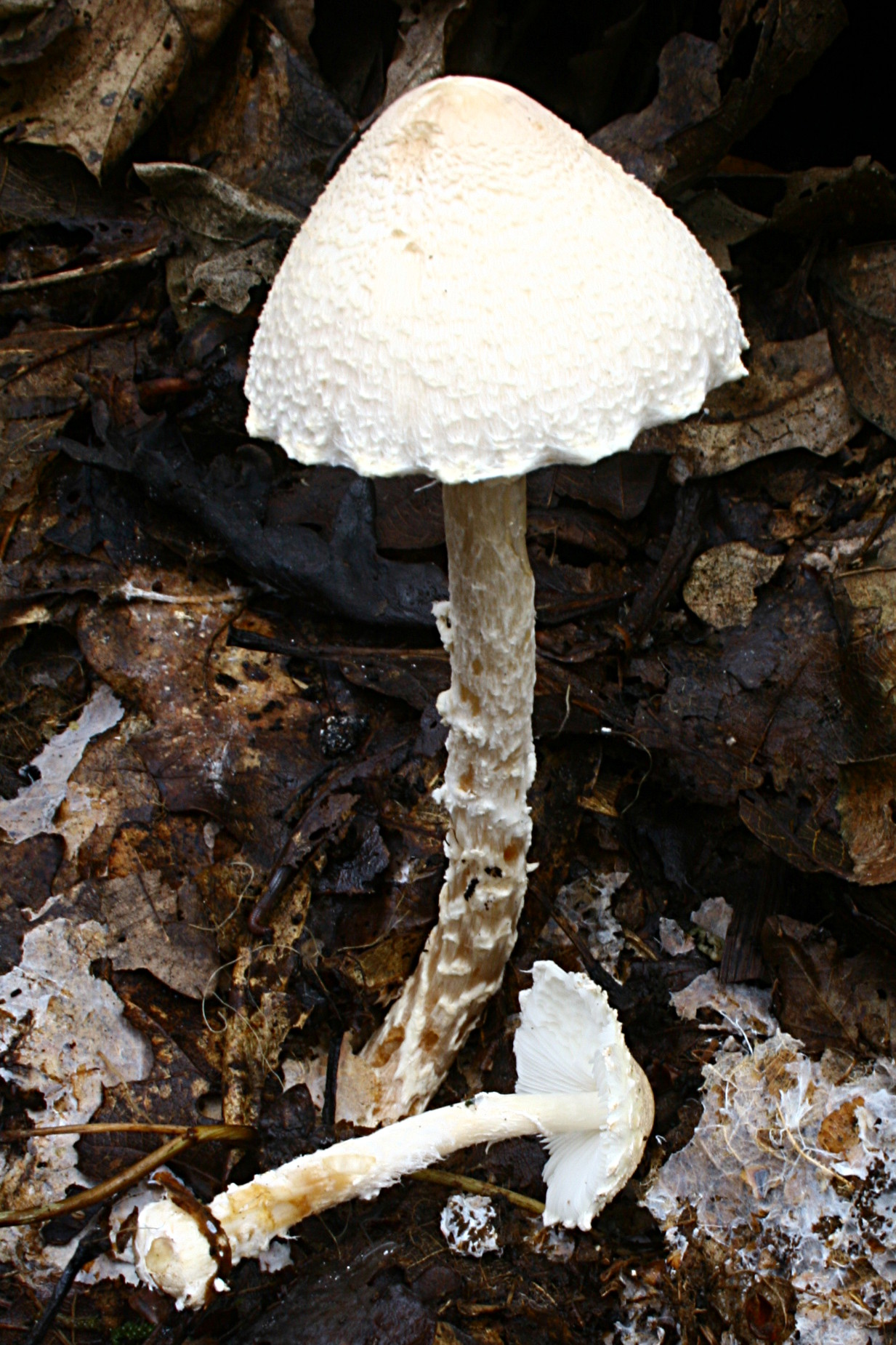
Forma ochraceosulfurescens

Lepiota ochraceosulfurescens may be distinguished as having a less defined dark area in the cap centre, a smell of rubber or melted butter, and yellow flesh in the stipe base, but Species Fungorum and Funga Nordica regard this name as a synonym.

Lepiota magnispora is similar in appearance but has brighter colours with a more intensely coloured cap center and longer spores.

== Habitat and distribution ==
The fruit bodies grow singly or in small groups on the ground in deciduous and coniferous forests. A common species, it is widespread in temperate regions of the Northern Hemisphere, and has been reported from Asia, Europe, North America, and South America. Fruiting occurs in autumn. In China, it is known from the provinces of Heilongjiang, Jilin, Liaoning, Jiangsu, Guangdong, and Yunnan.

== Toxicity ==
L. clypeolaria is considered poisonous, but more importantly, it resembles some of the more deadly species of its genus.

== See also ==
- List of Lepiota species
