= Cycloprop-2-ene carboxylic acid =

- Skeletal formula of cycloprop-2-ene carboxylic acid

Names
- Preferred IUPAC name Cycloprop-2-ene-1-carboxylic acid

Identifiers
CAS Number	26209-00-7
3D model (JSmol)	Interactive image
ChEMBL	ChEMBL1213481
ChemSpider	21782462
PubChem CID	25241629
UNII	NN7WE4ADQ8
CompTox Dashboard (EPA)	DTXSID201028873
- InChI: InChI=1S/C4H4O2/c5-4(6)3-1-2-3/h1-3H,(H,5,6) Key: DBWAQSJZNKRLLE-UHFFFAOYSA-N
- SMILES: C1(C=C1)C(=O)O

Properties
Chemical formula	C_{4}H_{4}O_{2}
Molar mass	84.074 g·mol^{−1}
Melting point	40–41 °C (104–106 °F; 313–314 K)
log P	−0.816
Acidity (pK_{a})	4.246
Basicity (pK_{b})	9.751
- Except where otherwise noted, data are given for materials in their standard state (at 25 °C [77 °F], 100 kPa). verify (what is ?) Infobox references

Cycloprop-2-ene carboxylic acid is a mycotoxin found in some mushrooms such as Russula subnigricans.

When ingested, the molecule is known to cause dose-dependent rhabdomyolysis.

In mice, the oral LD_{50} of this molecule is 2.5 mg/kg and poisoning is indicated by an increase in blood creatine phosphokinase levels.

Polymerization via the ene reaction abolishes toxicity.

3-(Cycloprop-2-en-1-oyl)oxazolidinones are a class of ‘unusually stable’ derivatives of the mycotoxin that have been synthesized by Fox et al. As mentioned by Fox et al, this class of ‘unusually stable’ derivatives are dienophiles when involved in a Diels-Alder reaction.

The pure substance is a hydroscopic white solid that is able to decarboxylate exothermically.
