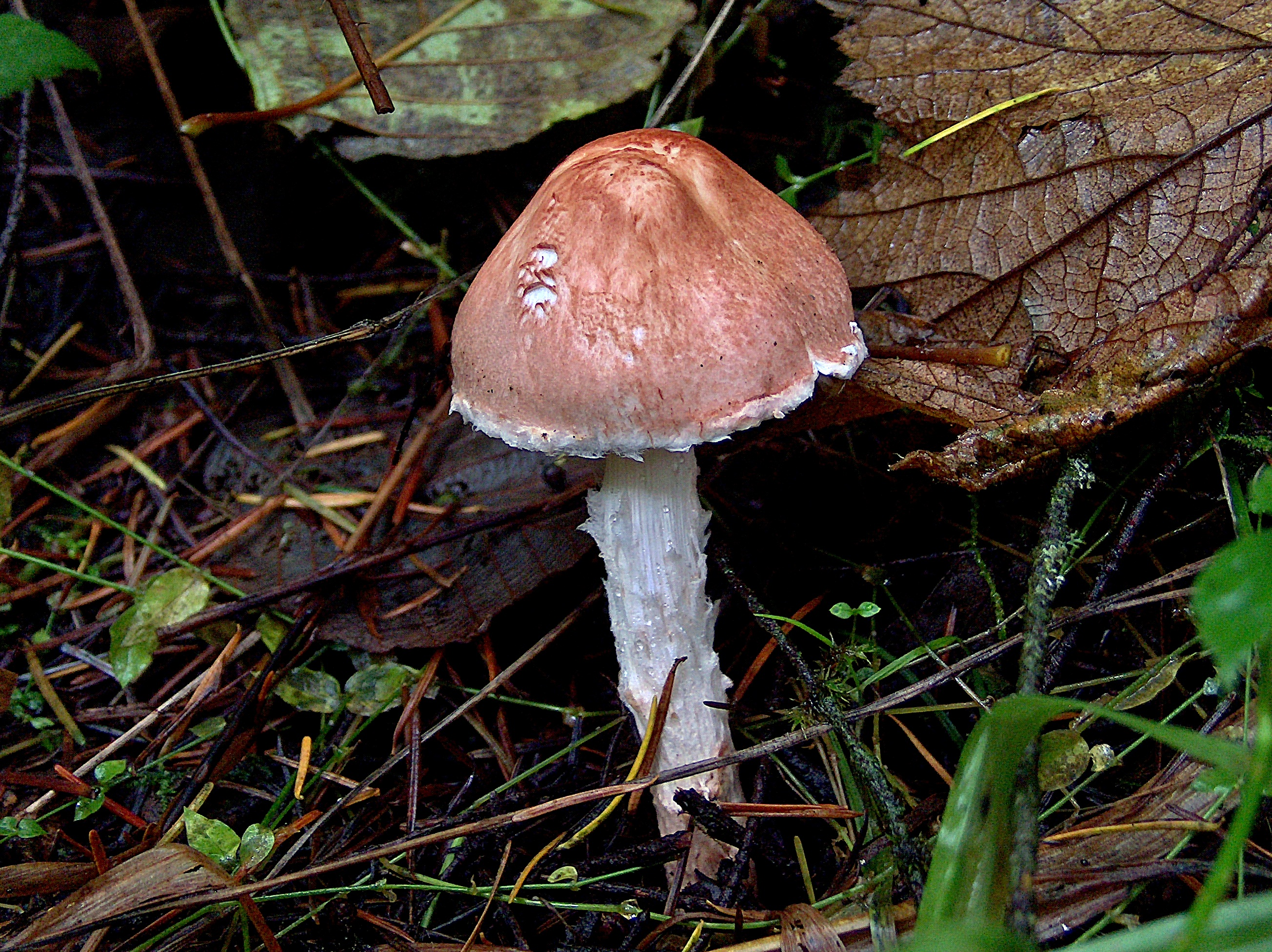

Scientific classification
- Domain: Eukaryota
- Kingdom: Fungi
- Division: Basidiomycota
- Class: Agaricomycetes
- Order: Agaricales
- Family: Agaricaceae
- Genus: Lepiota
- Species: L. subincarnata

Binomial name
- Lepiota subincarnata J.E.Lange (1940)

Synonyms
- Lepiota josserandii Bon & Boiffard (1975); Lepiota josserandii var. rosabrunnea Raithelh. (1988); Leucoagaricus josserandii (Bon & Boiffard) Raithelh. (1989); Leucoagaricus rosabrunneus (Raithelh.) Raithelh. (1989); Lepiota subincarnata var. josserandii (Bon & Boiffard) Gminder (1999)

= Lepiota subincarnata =

Species of fungus

Lepiota subincarnata Mycological characteristics
- Gills on hymenium
- Cap is convex or flat
- Hymenium is free
- Stipe has a ring
- Spore print is white
- Ecology is mycorrhizal
- Edibility is deadly

Lepiota subincarnata, commonly known as the fatal dapperling and deadly parasol, is a gilled mushroom of the genus Lepiota in the order Agaricales. It was first described scientifically by the Danish mycologist Jakob Emanuel Lange in 1940. Bon and Boiffard described Lepiota josserandii in 1974, which turned out to be the same species.

The mushroom's cap is light red to red-brown and cream-colored closer to the margin. The gills are whitish and the flesh is white to pinkish towards the top. The stem may be slightly larger at the base, cream-colored with patches of the cap color. The odor is somewhat fruity and the taste is unpleasant.

The species is found in Eurasia and North America, in woods as well as richly soiled parks. It is known to contain alpha-amanitin and consuming this fungus can be potentially lethal.

== See also ==
- List of deadly fungi
- List of Lepiota species
