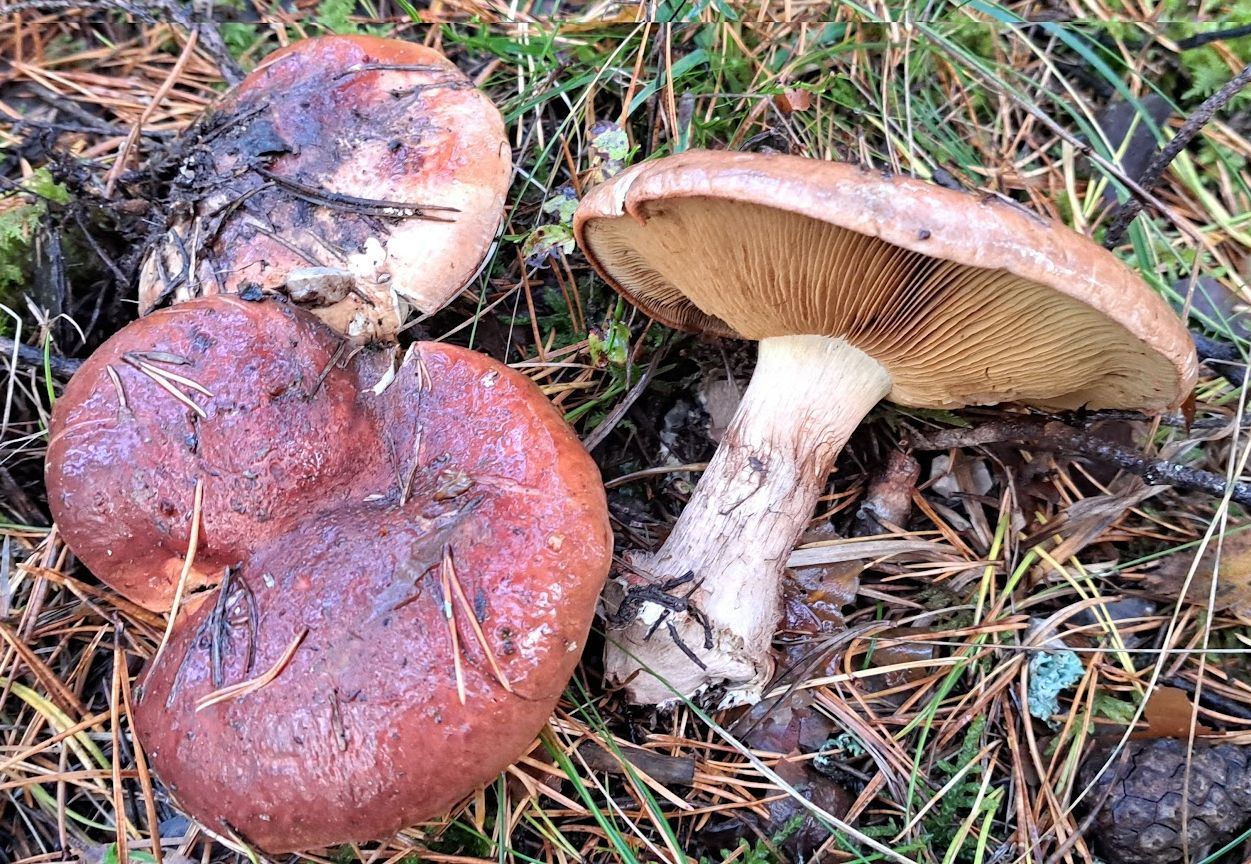

Conservation status
- Near Threatened (IUCN 3.1)

Scientific classification
- Kingdom: Fungi
- Division: Basidiomycota
- Class: Agaricomycetes
- Order: Agaricales
- Family: Cortinariaceae
- Genus: Calonarius
- Species: C. cupreorufus

Binomial name
- Calonarius cupreorufus (Brandrud) Niskanen & Liimat. (2022)

Synonyms
- Cortinarius cupreorufus Brandrud (1994)

= Calonarius cupreorufus =

Species of fungus

Calonarius cupreorufus is a species of fungus in the family Cortinariaceae.

== Taxonomy ==
It was first described in 1994 by the mycologist Tor Erik Brandrud who classified it as Cortinarius cupreorufus.

In 2022 the species was transferred from Cortinarius and reclassified as Calonarius cupreorufus based on genomic data.

== Habitat and distribution ==
It is native to Europe.
