= List of Hebeloma species =

This is a list of species in the agaric genus Hebeloma. A 2008 estimate placed about 150 in the genus. As of February 2024, Index Fungorum accepts 357 species in the genus:. A major revision of the European species was undertaken in Hebeloma in the Fungi Europaei series, published in March 2016. It concluded that there were 84 species of Hebeloma in Europe. As of November 2022, hebeloma.org lists over 500 names used throughout history, of which 135 are said to be current, valid (non-synonymous) names.

== A ==
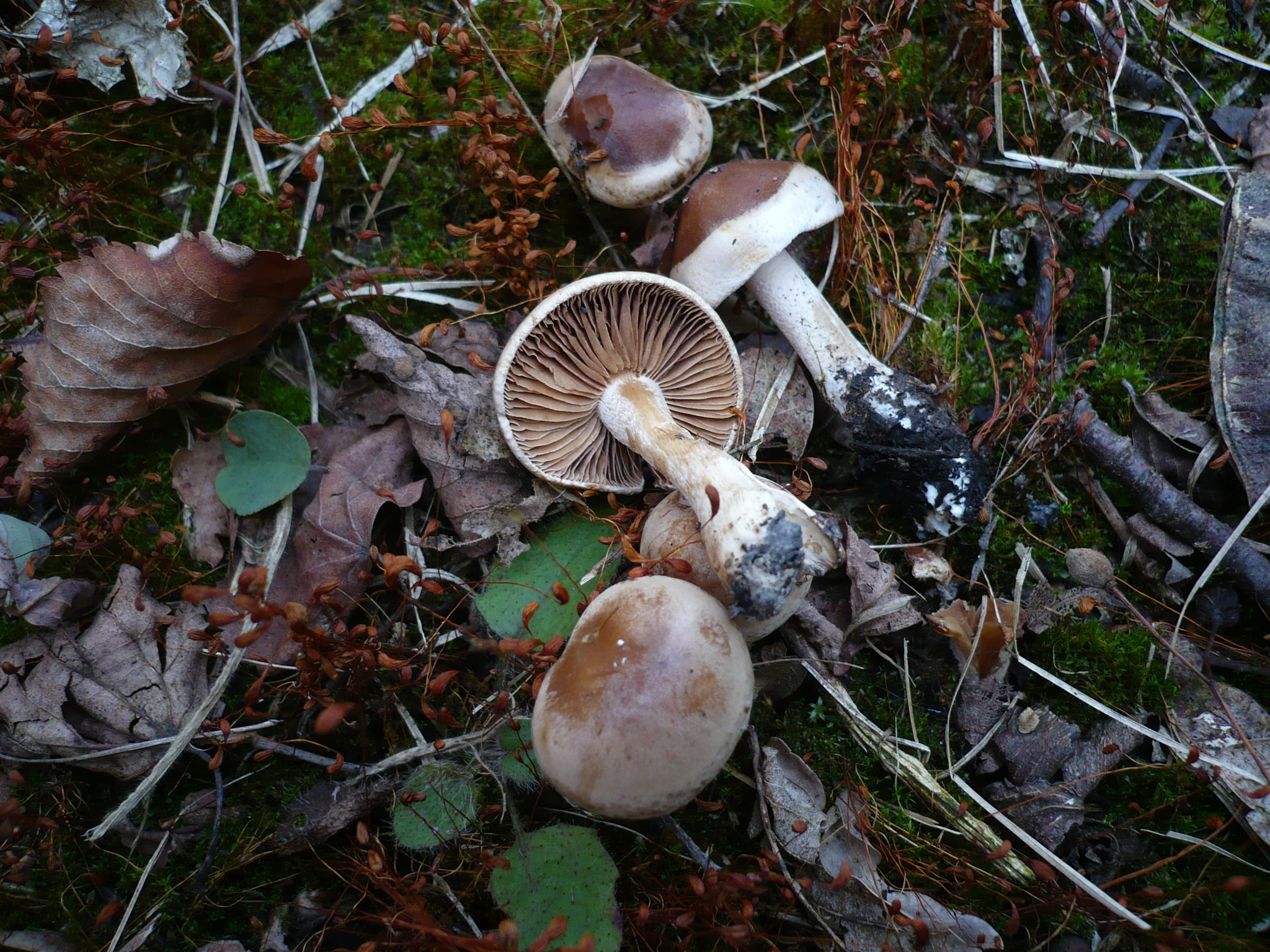
Hebeloma anthracophilum

- Hebeloma aestivale Vesterh. 1995
- Hebeloma alboerumpens Vila, Beker & U.Eberh. 2012
- Hebeloma alpinicola A.H. Sm., V.S. Evenson & Mitchel 1983
- Hebeloma alpinum (J.Favre 1955) Bruchet 1970
- Hebeloma aminophilum R.N.Hilton & O.K.Mill. 1986
- Hebeloma ammophilum Bohus (1978)
- Hebeloma angelesiense A.H. Sm., V.S. Evenson & Mitchel 1983
- Hebeloma anthracophilum Maire 1908
- Hebeloma arcticum Beker & U. Eberh. 2021
- Hebeloma arenosum Burds., Macfall & M.A.Albers 1986
- Hebeloma atrobrunneum Vesterh. 1989 – Great Britain
- Hebeloma aurantiellum A.H.Sm., V.S.Evenson & Mitchel 1983
- Hebeloma aurantioumbrinum Beker, Vesterh. & U. Eberh. 2015;
- Hebeloma australe Murrill 1945
- Hebeloma austroamericanum (Speg. 1881) Sacc. 1887
- Hebeloma avellaneum Kauffman 1933

== B ==
- Hebeloma bakeri Earle 1902
- Hebeloma barrowsii A.H.Sm., V.S.Evenson & Mitchel 1983
- Hebeloma bicoloratum A.H.Sm., V.S.Evenson & Mitchel 1983
- Hebeloma birrus (Fr. 1838) Gillet 1884 – United Kingdom
- Hebeloma boulderense A.H.Sm., V.S.Evenson & Mitchel 1983
- Hebeloma bruchetii Bon 1986 – United Kingdom
- Hebeloma brunneifolium Hesler 1977
- Hebeloma brunneodiscum A.H.Sm., V.S.Evenson & Mitchel 1983
- Hebeloma brunneomaculatum A.H.Sm., V.S.Evenson & Mitchel 1983
- Hebeloma bryogenes Vesterh. 1993
- Hebeloma bryophilum Murrill 1917
- Hebeloma bulbaceum Herp. 1912
- Hebeloma bulbiferum Maire 1937
- Hebeloma busporus E.H.L.Krause 1928

== C ==
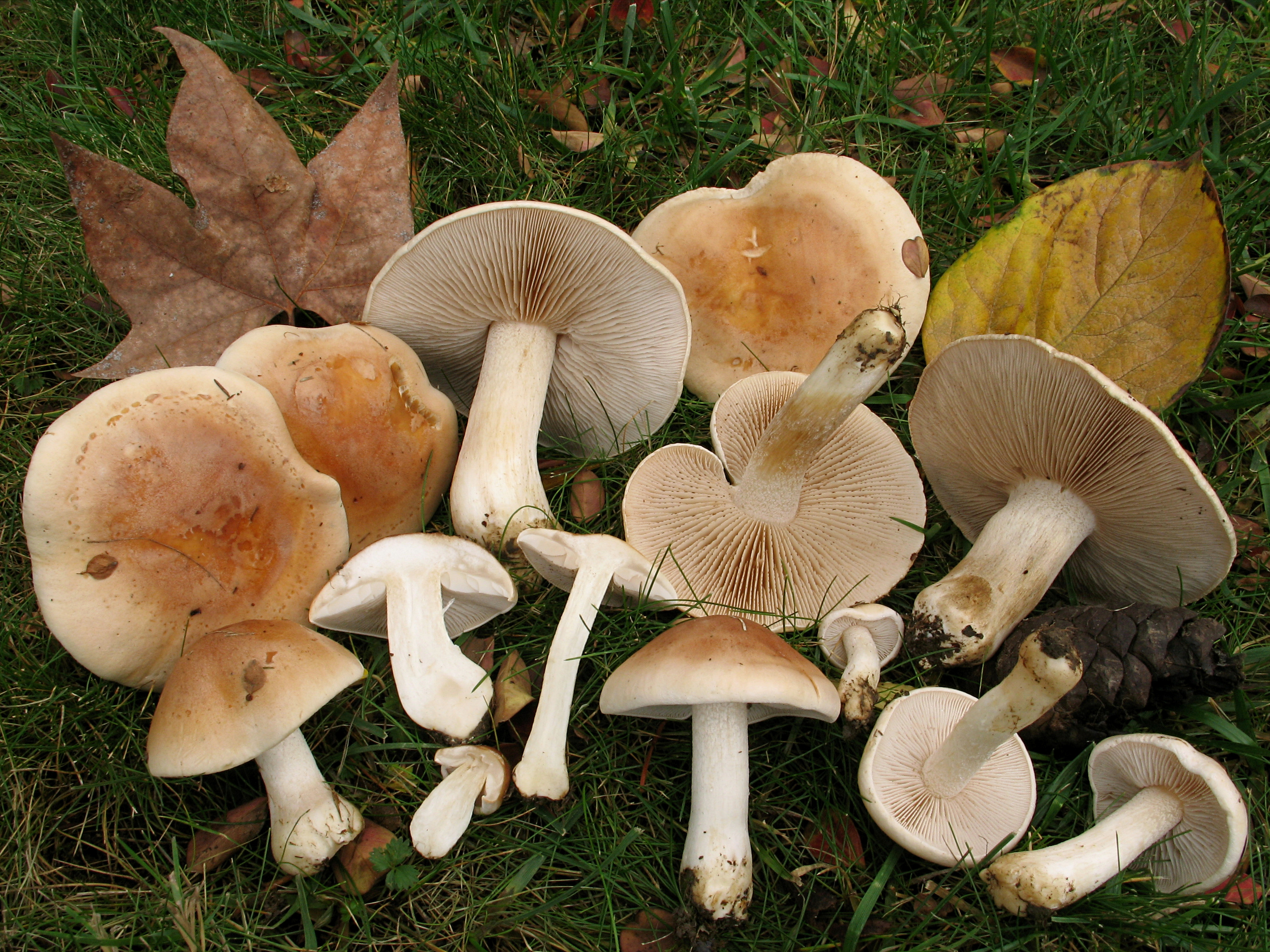
Hebeloma crustuliniforme

- Hebeloma caespitosum Velen. 1920
- Hebeloma californicum Murrill 1917
- Hebeloma calyptrosporum Bruchet 1970 – United Kingdom
- Hebeloma candidipes Bruchet 1970
- Hebeloma caulocystidiosum Hesler 1977
- Hebeloma cavipes Huijsman 1961 – Great Britain
- Hebeloma chapmaniae A.H.Sm., V.S.Evenson & Mitchel 1983
- Hebeloma chlorophyllum Speg. 1926
- Hebeloma cinereostipes A.H.Sm., V.S.Evenson & Mitchel 1983
- Hebeloma cinereum Velen. 1920
- Hebeloma circinans (Quél. 1888) Sacc. 1891 – Great Britain
- Hebeloma cistophilum Maire 1928
- Hebeloma clavulipes Romagn. 1965
- Hebeloma coarctatum (Cooke & Massee 1889) Pegler 1965 – Victoria
- Hebeloma collariatum Bruchet 1970
- Hebeloma colossus Huijsman 1961 – Great Britain
- Hebeloma colvinii (Peck 1876) Sacc. 1887
- Hebeloma commune (Peck 1870) Murrill 1917
- Hebeloma coniferarum A.H.Sm., V.S.Evenson & Mitchel 1983
- Hebeloma coprophilum Rick 1907
- Hebeloma corrugatum A.H.Sm., V.S.Evenson & Mitchel 1983
- Hebeloma cortinarioides E.H.L.Krause 1928
- Hebeloma crassipes Rick 1961
- Hebeloma cremeopallidum (Esteve-Rav. & Heykoop 1990) Esteve-Rav. & Heykoop 1997
- Hebeloma cremeum Murrill 1917
- Hebeloma crustuliniforme (Bull. 1787) Quél. 1872
- Hebeloma cylindrosporum Romagn. 1965

== D ==
- Hebeloma discomorbidum (Peck 1873) Peck 1910
- Hebeloma dissiliens A.H.Sm., V.S.Evenson & Mitchel 1983
- Hebeloma domardianum (Maire 1935) Beker, U.Eberh. & Vesterh. 2005
- Hebeloma dryophilum Murrill 1917
- Hebeloma dunense L.Corb. & R.Heim 1929 – Great Britain
- Hebeloma duracinoides Bidaud & Fillion 1991

== E ==
- Hebeloma earlei Murrill 1917
- Hebeloma eburneum Malençon 1970
- Hebeloma ellipsoideosporium Hesler 1977
- Hebeloma erumpens Contu 1993
- Hebeloma evensoniae A.H.Sm. & Mitchel 1983
- Hebeloma excedens (Peck 1871) Sacc. 1887
- Hebeloma exiguifolium Murrill 1917

== F ==
- Hebeloma farinaceum Murrill 1917
- Hebeloma fastibile (Pers. 1801) P.Kumm. 1871
- Hebeloma favrei Romagn. & Quadr. 1985
- Hebeloma felipponei Speg. 1926
- Hebeloma felleum A.H.Sm., V.S.Evenson & Mitchel 1983
- Hebeloma fimicola S.Imai 1938
- Hebeloma flaccidum A.H.Sm., V.S.Evenson & Mitchel 1983
- Hebeloma flavescens Rick 1930
- Hebeloma flavidifolium (Corner 1993) Beker & U. Eberh. 2021
- Hebeloma flexuosipes Peck 1911
- Hebeloma floridanum Murrill 1940
- Hebeloma fragilipes Romagn. 1965 – Great Britain
- Hebeloma fragilius (Peck 1874) Sacc. 1887
- Hebeloma fragrans A.H.Sm., V.S.Evenson & Mitchel 1983
- Hebeloma fragrantissimum Velen. 1920
- Hebeloma frenchii McAlpine 1899
- Hebeloma funariophyllum M.M.Moser 1970
- Hebeloma fuscatum Beker & U. Eberh. 2016
- Hebeloma fuscostipes A.H.Sm., V.S.Evenson & Mitchel 1983
- Hebeloma fusisporum Gröger & Zschiesch. 1981 – Great Britain

== G ==
- Hebeloma geminatum Beker, Vesterh. & U. Eberh. 2015
- Hebeloma gigaspermum Gröger & Zschiesch. 1981 – Europe
- Hebeloma glabrescens A.H.Sm., V.S.Evenson & Mitchel 1983
- Hebeloma gomezii Singer 1983
- Hebeloma grandisporum Beker, U. Eberh. & A. Ronikier 2015
- Hebeloma gregarium Peck 1897
- Hebeloma griseocanescens A.H.Sm., V.S.Evenson & Mitchel 1983
- Hebeloma griseocanum A.H.Sm., V.S.Evenson & Mitchel 1983
- Hebeloma griseopruinatum Vesterh., Beker & U.Eberh. 2012
- Hebeloma griseovelatum A.H.Sm., V.S.Evenson & Mitchel 1983
- Hebeloma griseum McAlpine 1895 – Victoria

== H ==
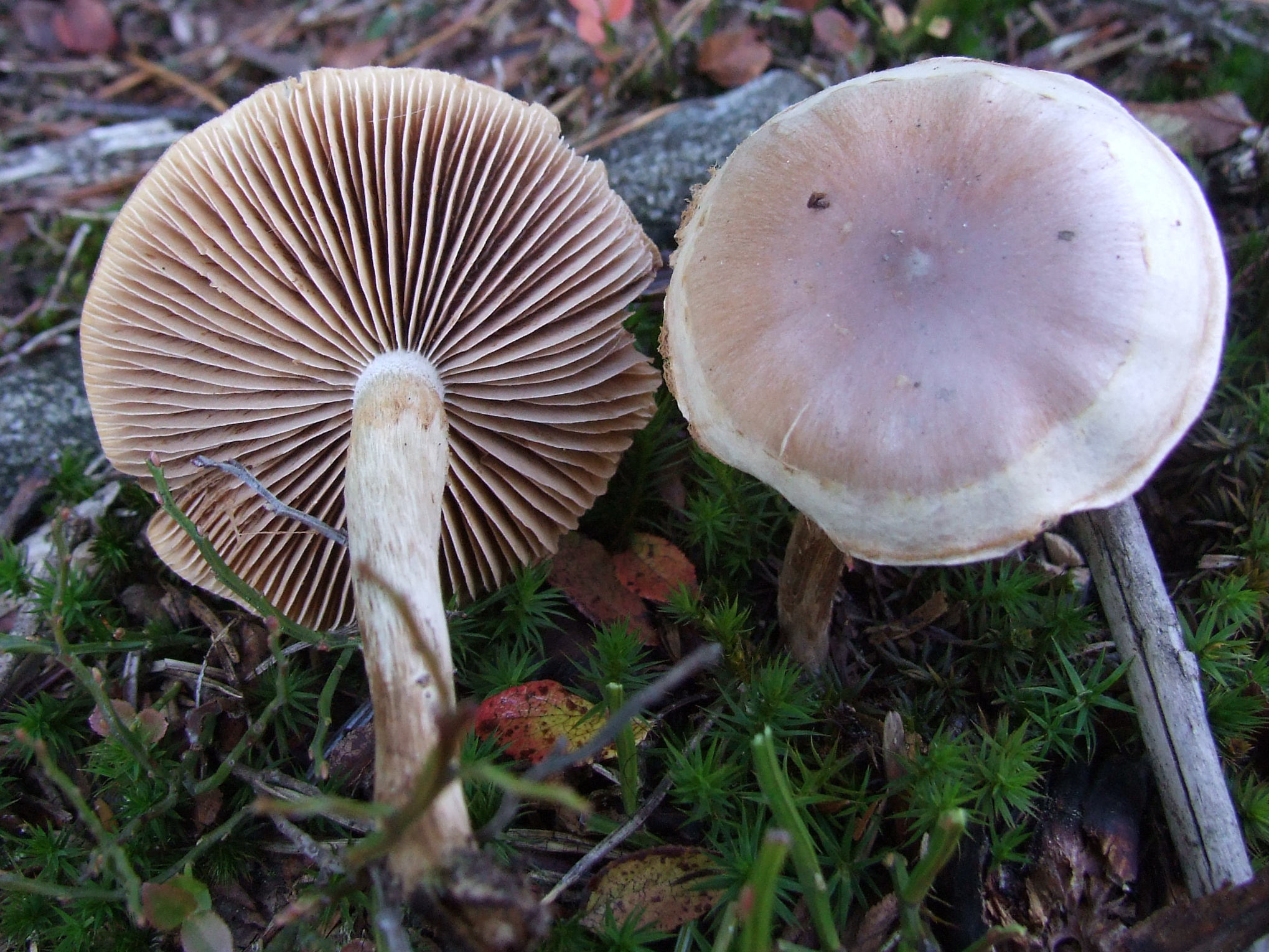
Hebeloma helodes

- Hebeloma harperi Murrill 1917
- Hebeloma helodes J.Favre 1948 – Great Britain
- Hebeloma helvolescens S.Imai 1938
- Hebeloma hemisphaericum Herp. 1912
- Hebeloma herrmanniae Gröger 1985
- Hebeloma hesleri A.H.Sm., V.S.Evenson & Mitchel 1983
- Hebeloma hetieri Boud. 1917 – Europe
- Hebeloma hiemale Bres. 1892 – Great Britain
- Hebeloma humile Rick 1961
- Hebeloma humosum S.Imai 1938
- Hebeloma hydrocybeoides A.H.Sm., V.S.Evenson & Mitchel 1983
- Hebeloma hygrophilum Poumarat & Corriol 2016

== I ==
- Hebeloma idahoense A.H.Sm., V.S.Evenson & Mitchel 1983
- Hebeloma igneum Rick 1938
- Hebeloma immutabile A.H.Sm., V.S.Evenson & Mitchel 1983
- Hebeloma incarnatulum A.H.Sm. 1984
- Hebeloma indecisum A.H.Sm., V.S.Evenson & Mitchel 1983
- Hebeloma indicum (K.A.Thomas, Peintner, M.M.Moser & Manim. 2002) B.J.Rees & Orlovich 2013
- Hebeloma ingratum Bruchet 1970
- Hebeloma insigne A.H.Sm., V.S.Evenson & Mitchel 1983
- Hebeloma islandicum Beker & U. Eberh. 2016

== J ==
- Hebeloma juneauense A.H.Sm., V.S.Evenson & Mitchel 1983

== K ==
- Hebeloma kammala Grgur. 1997
- Hebeloma kanouseae A.H. Sm., V.S. Evenson & Mitchel 1983
- Hebeloma kauffmanii A.H. Sm., V.S. Evenson & Mitchel 1983
- Hebeloma kelloggense A.H. Sm., V.S. Evenson & Mitchel 1983
- Hebeloma kemptoniae A.H. Sm., V.S. Evenson & Mitchel 1983
- Hebeloma khogianum Bresinsky 2001
- Hebeloma kirtonii (Kalchbr. 1883) McAlpine 1895
- Hebeloma kuehneri Bruchet 1970

== L ==
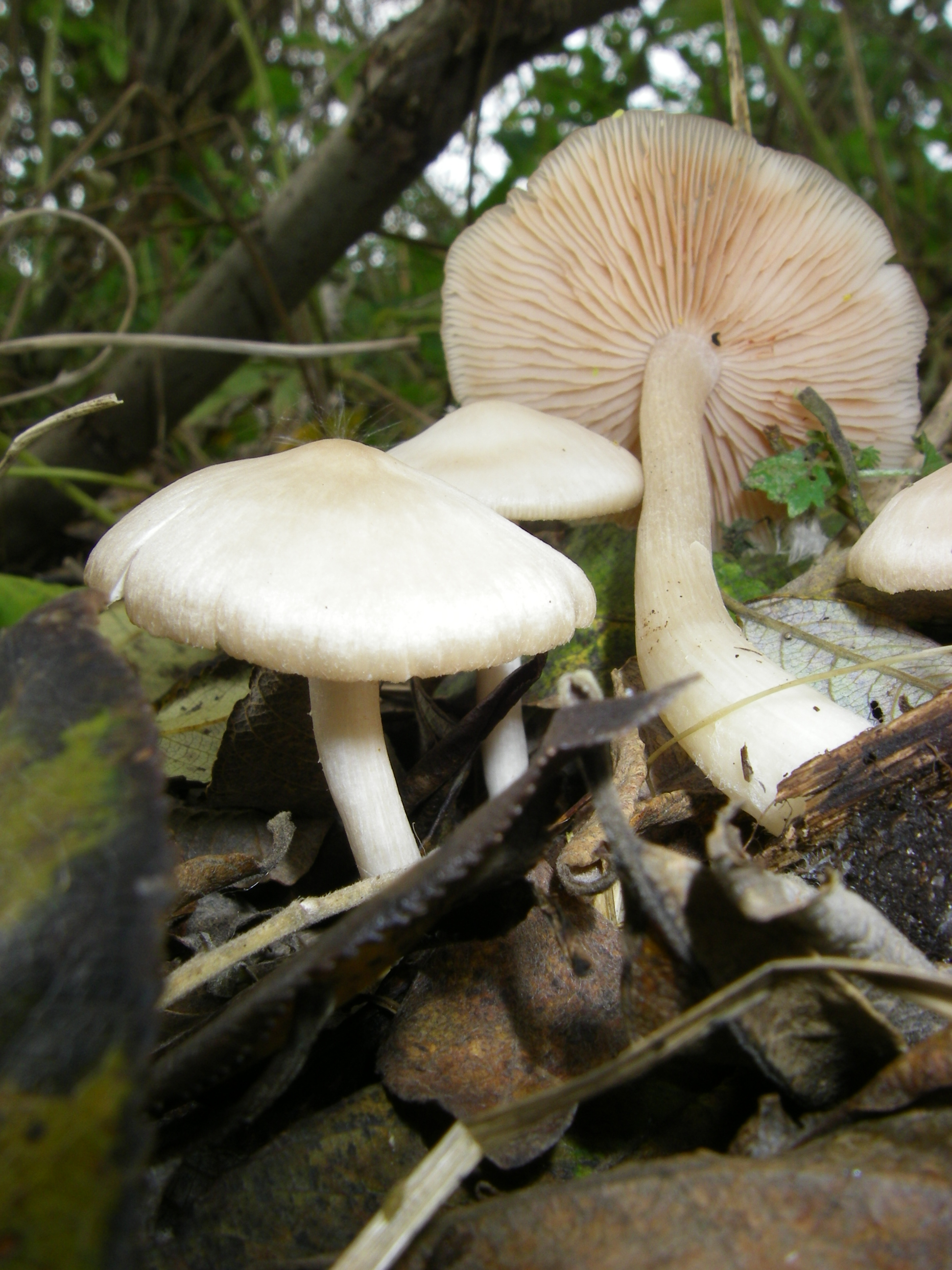
Hebeloma leucosarx

- Hebeloma lactariolens (Clémençon & Hongo 1994) B.J. Rees & Orlovich 2013
- Hebeloma laetitiae Quadr. 1993 - Italy
- Hebeloma lamelliconfertum Cleland 1934 – South Australia
- Hebeloma laterinum (Batsch 1789) Vesterh. 2005 – United Kingdom
- Hebeloma lateritium Murrill 1917
- Hebeloma latisporum A.H.Sm., V.S.Evenson & Mitchel 1983
- Hebeloma leucosarx P.D.Orton 1960 – United Kingdom
- Hebeloma levyanum Murrill 1946
- Hebeloma lignicola Rick 1938
- Hebeloma limacinum A.H.Sm., V.S.Evenson & Mitchel 1983
- Hebeloma litoreum Quadr. 1993 – Italy
- Hebeloma littenii A.H.Sm., V.S.Evenson & Mitchel 1983
- Hebeloma longisporum Murrill 1945
- Hebeloma louiseae Beker, Vesterh. & U.Eberh 2016
- Hebeloma lubriciceps (Kauffman & A.H. Sm. 1933) Hesler & A.H.Sm. 1984
- Hebeloma luchuense Fukiharu & Hongo 1995
- Hebeloma lucidum Murrill 1946
- Hebeloma lundqvistii Vesterh. 1993
- Hebeloma luteobrunneum A.H.Sm., V.S.Evenson & Mitchel 1983
- Hebeloma lutescentipes A.H.Sm., V.S.Evenson & Mitchel 1983
- Hebeloma luteum Murrill 1917

== M ==
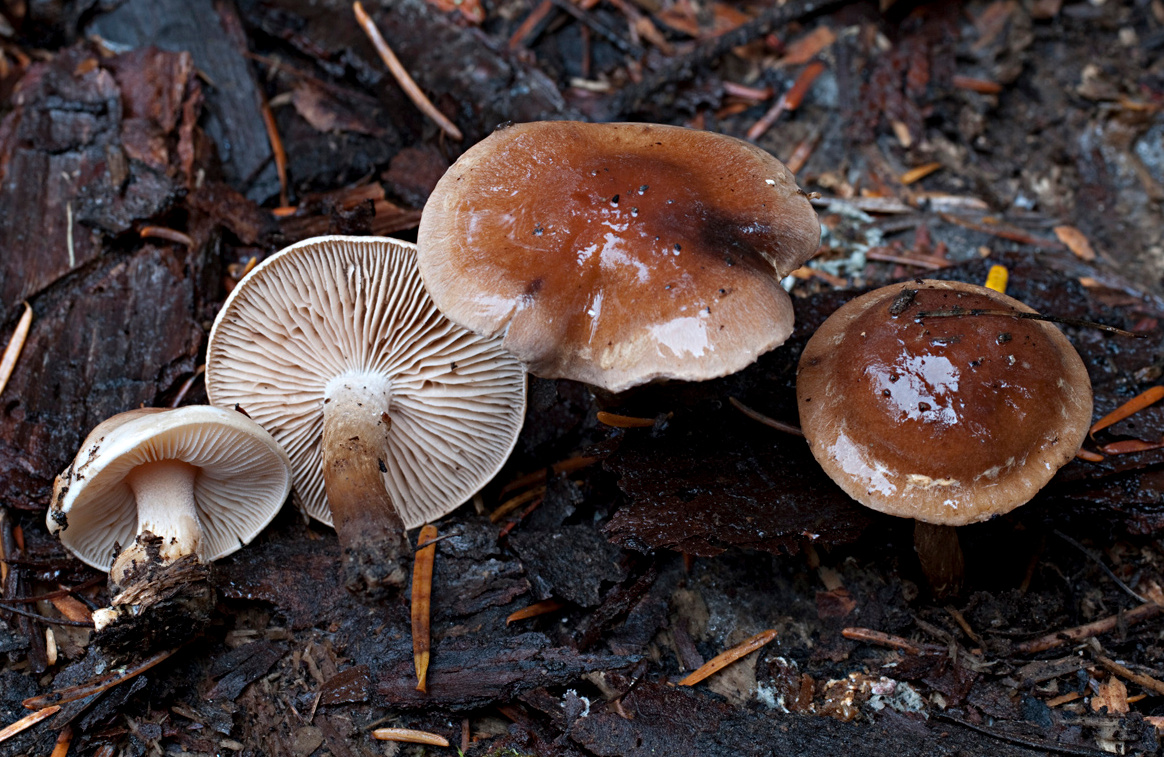
Hebeloma mesophaeum

- Hebeloma mackinawense Hesler & A.H.Sm. 1984
- Hebeloma macrosporum Velen. 1920
- Hebeloma majale Velen. 1920
- Hebeloma malenconii Bellù & Lanzoni 1988
- Hebeloma mammillatum Velen. 1939
- Hebeloma mammosum Rick 1930
- Hebeloma marginatulum (J.Favre 1955) Bruchet 1970
- Hebeloma maritinum A.H.Sm., V.S.Evenson & Mitchel 1983
- Hebeloma mediorufum Soop 2001
- Hebeloma mediterraneum (A.Gennari 2002) Contu 2008 – Italy
- Hebeloma megacarpum A.H.Sm. ex Grilli 2005
- Hebeloma mesophaeum (Pers. 1828) Quél. 1872 – Europe; Australia
- Hebeloma minus Bruchet 1970
- Hebeloma miserum Rick 1930
- Hebeloma montanum Cleland & Cheel 1918
- Hebeloma moseri Singer 1969

== N ==
- Hebeloma nanum Velen. 1939
- Hebeloma naucorioides Rick 1938
- Hebeloma naufragum (Speg. 1887) Sacc. 1891
- Hebeloma naviculosporum Heykoop, G.Moreno & Esteve-Rav. 1992
- Hebeloma neurophyllum G.F.Atk. 1909
- Hebeloma nigellum Bruchet 1970 – United Kingdom
- Hebeloma nigricans Velen. 1920
- Hebeloma nigromaculatum A.H.Sm., V.S.Evenson & Mitchel 1983
- Hebeloma nitidum Hesler 1977

== O ==
- Hebeloma obscurum A.H.Sm., V.S.Evenson & Mitchel 1983
- Hebeloma occidentale A.H.Sm., V.S.Evenson & Mitchel 1983
- Hebeloma ochraceum W.F. Chiu 1973
- Hebeloma ochroalbidum Bohus 1972 – Channel Islands
- Hebeloma octavii Velen. 1939
- Hebeloma oculatum Bruchet 1970 – United Kingdom
- Hebeloma odoratum Velen. 1920
- Hebeloma ollaliense A.H.Sm., V.S.Evenson & Mitchel 1983
- Hebeloma olympianum A.H.Sm., V.S.Evenson & Mitchel 1983
- Hebeloma oregonense A.H.Sm., V.S.Evenson & Mitchel 1983
- Hebeloma oreophilum Beker & U. Eberh. 2015

== P ==
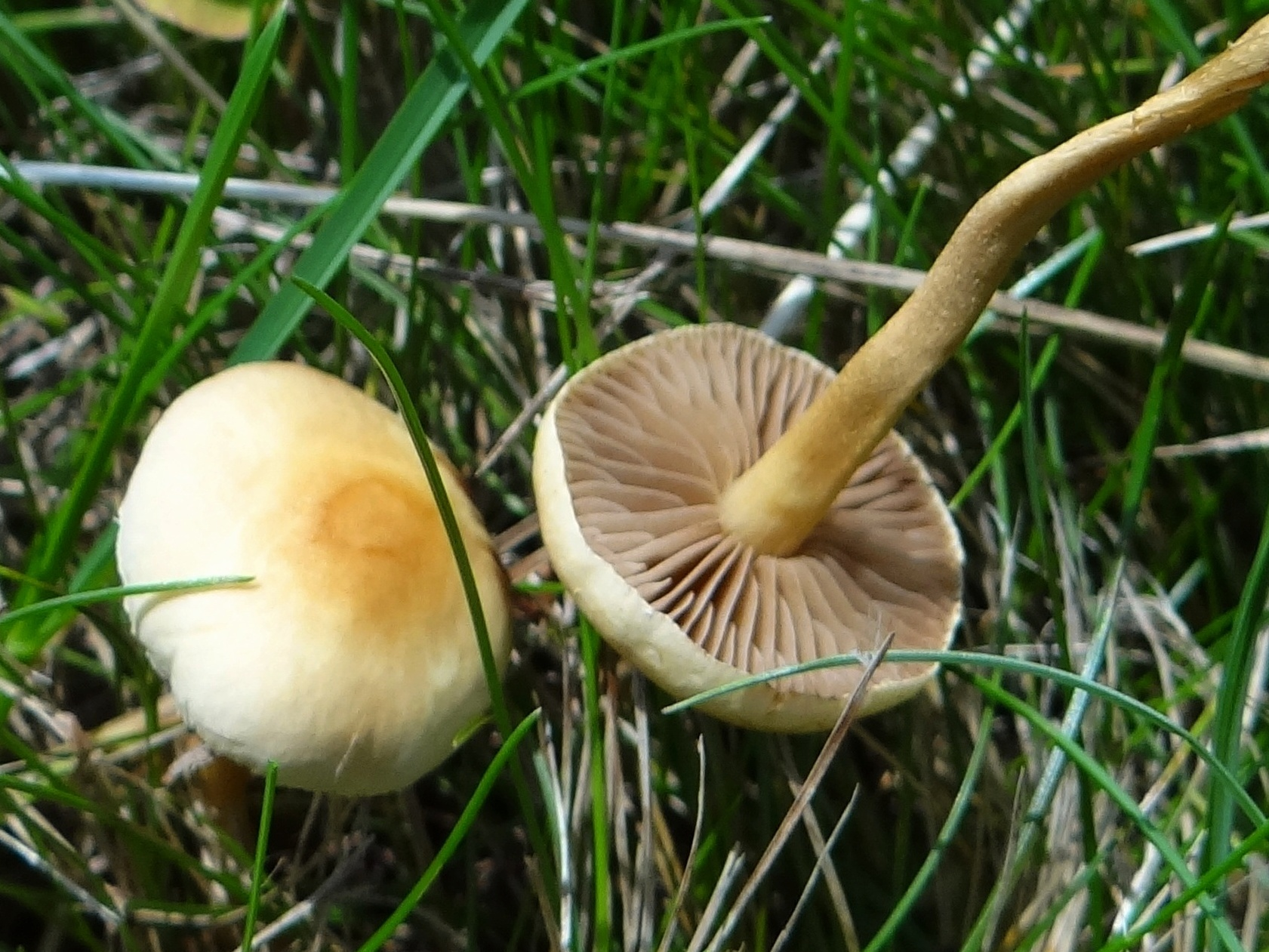
Hebeloma pusillum

- Hebeloma pallescens A.H.Sm., V.S.Evenson & Mitchel 1983
- Hebeloma pallidifolium Murrill 1945
- Hebeloma pallidoargillaceum A.H.Sm., V.S.Evenson & Mitchel 1983
- Hebeloma pallidoluctuosum Gröger & Zschiesch. 1984 – United Kingdom
- Hebeloma pallidomarginatum (Peck 1873) Sacc. 1887 – New York
- Hebeloma paludicola Murrill 1917
- Hebeloma pamphiliense Cittadini, Lezzi & Contu 2008
- Hebeloma parvicystidiatum Beker, Vesterh. & U.Eberh. 2012
- Hebeloma parcivelum A.H.Sm., V.S.Evenson & Mitchel 1983
- Hebeloma parvisporum O.S. Pedersen, Læssøe, Beker & U. Eberh. 2020
- Hebeloma pascuense Peck 1901
- Hebeloma peckii House 1915
- Hebeloma perangustisporium Hesler 1977
- Hebeloma perfarinaceum A.H.Sm., V.S.Evenson & Mitchel 1983
- Hebeloma perigoense A.H.Sm., V.S.Evenson & Mitchel 1983
- Hebeloma perpallidum M.M. Moser 1970
- Hebeloma perplexum A.H.Sm., V.S. Evenson & Mitchel 1983
- Hebeloma petrakii (Hruby 1929?) Singer 1951
- Hebeloma piceicola A.H.Sm., V.S.Evenson & Mitchel 1983
- Hebeloma pinetorum A.H.Sm., V.S.Evenson & Mitchel 1983
- Hebeloma pitkinense A.H.Sm., V.S.Evenson & Mitchel 1983
- Hebeloma platense Speg. 1898
- Hebeloma plesiocistum Beker, U.Eberh. & Vila 2009
- Hebeloma polare Vesterh. 1989
- Hebeloma politum Hesler 1977
- Hebeloma populinum Romagn. 1965
- Hebeloma porphyrosporum Maire 1931 – Italy
- Hebeloma praecaespitosum A.H.Sm., V.S.Evenson & Mitchel 1983
- Hebeloma praefarinaceum Murrill 1938
- Hebeloma praefelleum Murrill 1945
- Hebeloma praelatifolium A.H.Sm., V.S.Evenson & Mitchel 1983
- Hebeloma praeolidum A.H.Sm., V.S.Evenson & Mitchel 1983
- Hebeloma praeviscidum Murrill 1946
- Hebeloma proletaria Velen. 1920
- Hebeloma proximum A.H.Sm., V.S. Evenson & Mitchel 1983
- Hebeloma psammicola Bohus 1978
- Hebeloma psammophilum Bon 1986 – United Kingdom
- Hebeloma pseudoamarescens (Kühner & Romagn. 1947) P.Collin 1988 – United Kingdom
- Hebeloma pseudofastabile A.H.Sm., V.S.Evenson & Mitchel 1983
- Hebeloma pseudomesophaeum A.H.Sm., V.S.Evenson & Mitchel 1983
- Hebeloma pseudostrophosum A.H.Sm., V.S.Evenson & Mitchel 1983
- Hebeloma pubescens Beker & U. Eberh. 2016
- Hebeloma pudica Hruby 1930
- Hebeloma pumiloides A.H.Sm., V.S.Evenson & Mitchel 1983
- Hebeloma punctatiforme Hruby 1930
- Hebeloma pungens A.H.Sm., V.S.Evenson & Mitchel 1983
- Hebeloma pusillum J.E.Lange 1940 – United Kingdom
- Hebeloma pyrophilum G.Moreno & M.M.Moser 1984

== Q ==
- Hebeloma quercetorum Quadr. 1993 – Italy

== R ==
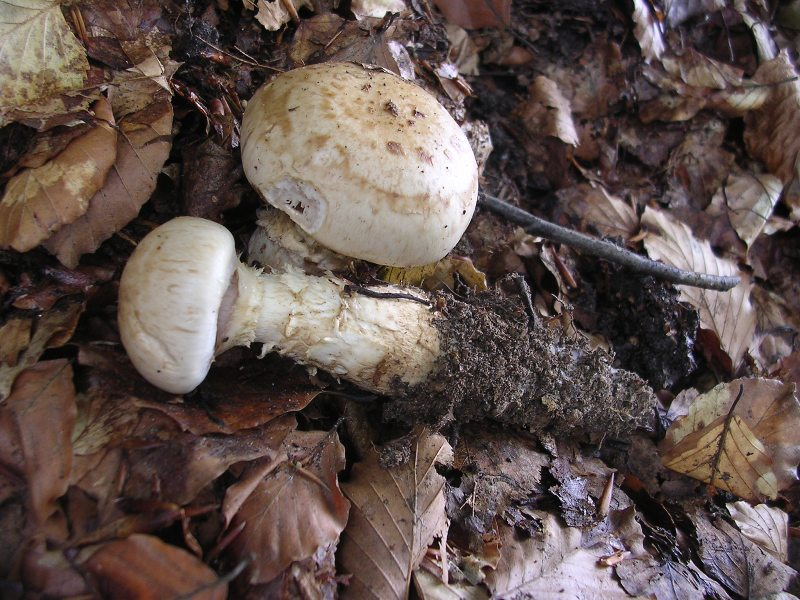
Hebeloma radicosum

- Hebeloma radicans E. Horak, Beker & U. Eberh. 2021
- Hebeloma radicosoides Sagara, Hongo & Y.Murak 2000
- Hebeloma radicosum (Bull.) Ricken 1911 – Europe
- Hebeloma remyi Bruchet 1970
- Hebeloma repandum (Schumach. 1803) Konrad & Maubl. 1937
- Hebeloma riparium A.H.Sm., V.S.Evenson & Mitchel 1983
- Hebeloma rivulosum Hesler 1977
- Hebeloma rubrofuscum Velen. 1920

== S ==
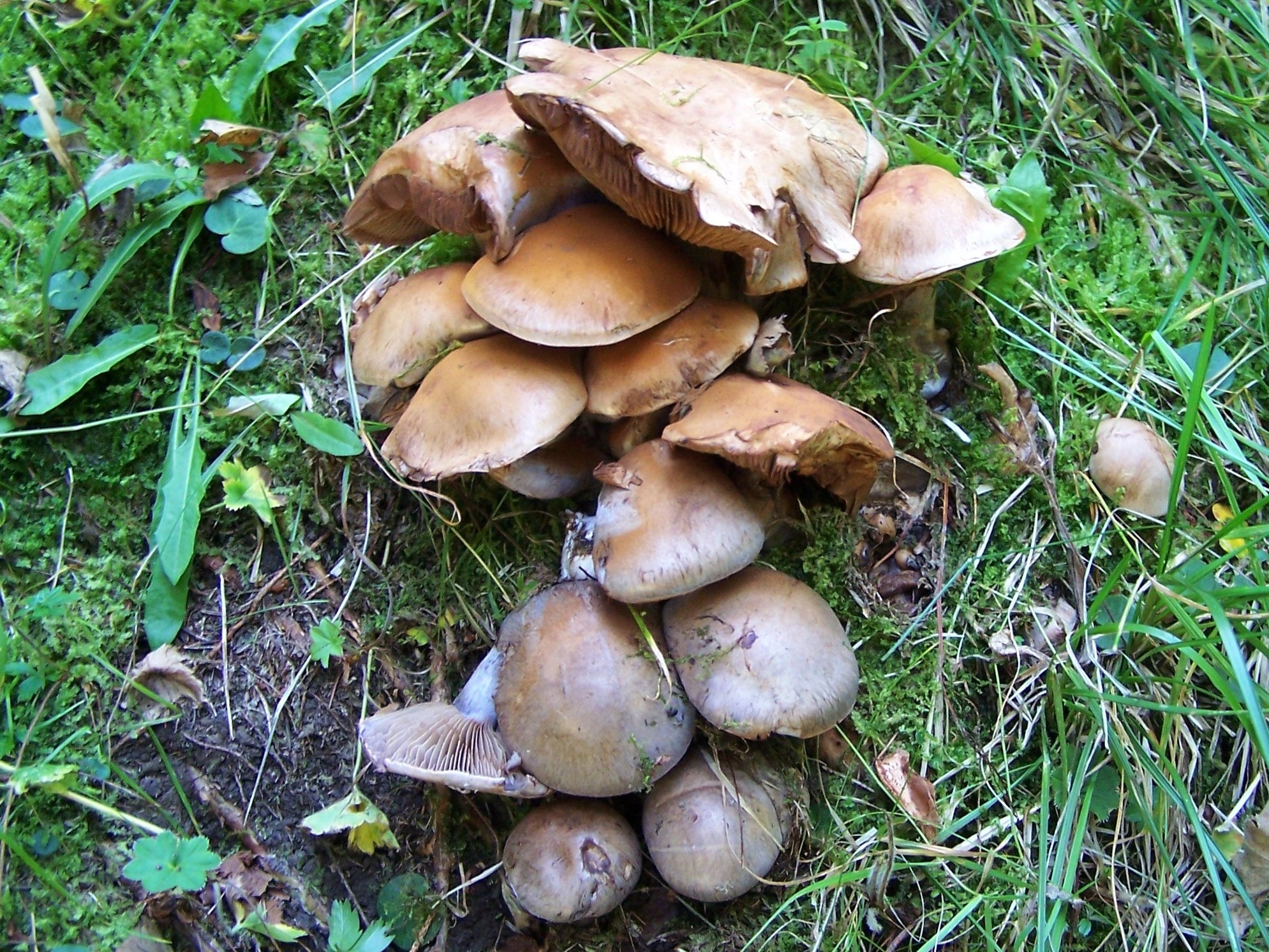
Hebeloma sacchariolens

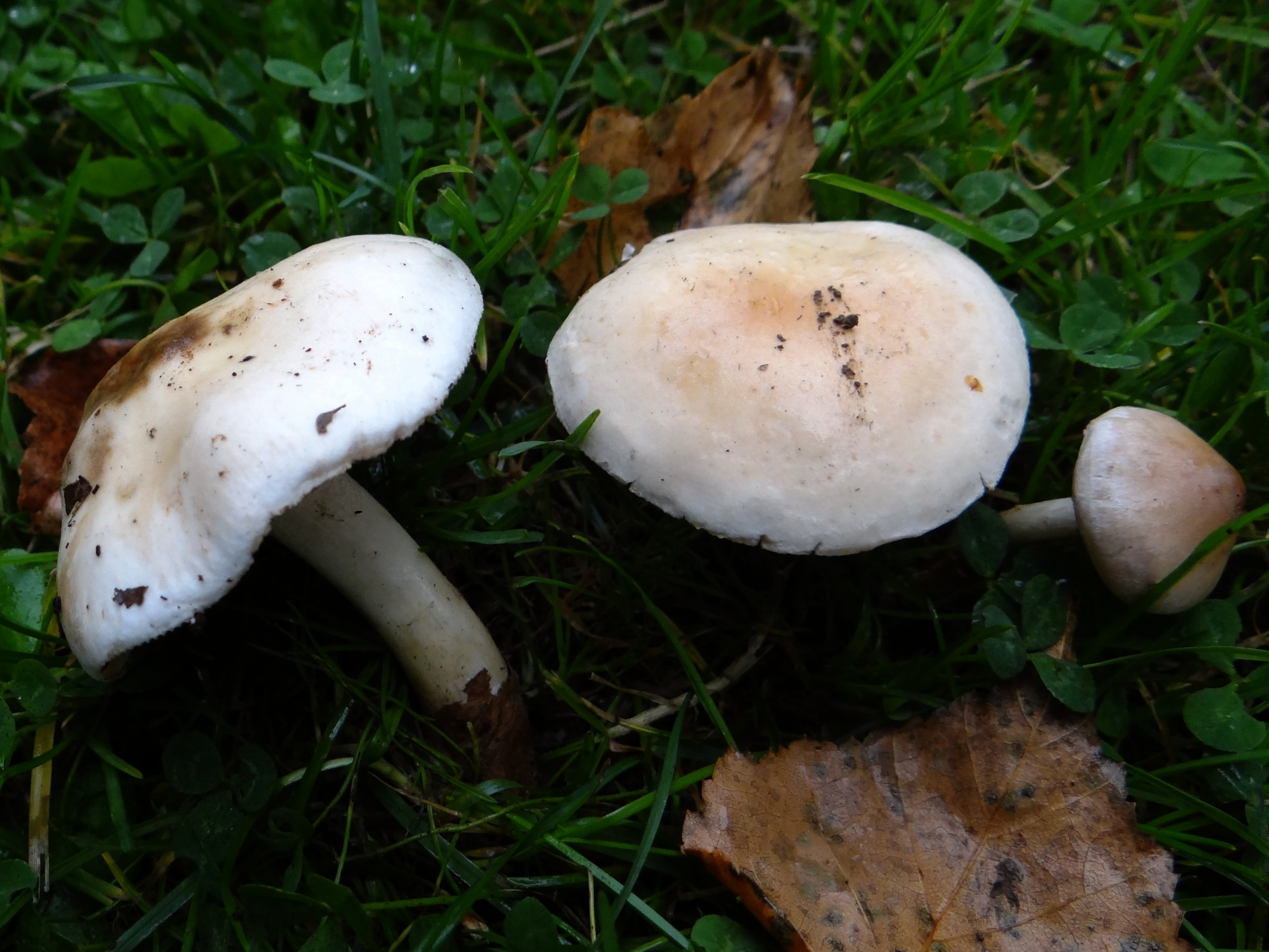
Hebeloma sinapizans

- Hebeloma sacchariolens Quél. 1880 – United Kingdom
- Hebeloma salmonense A.H.Sm., V.S.Evenson & Mitchel 1983
- Hebeloma sanjuanense A.H.Sm., V.S.Evenson & Mitchel 1983
- Hebeloma sarcophyllum (Peck 1870) Sacc. 1887
- Hebeloma sericipes Earle 1902
- Hebeloma serratum (Cleland 1933) E. Horak 1980
- Hebeloma simile Kauffman 1918
- Hebeloma elatum (Batsch 1789) Gillet 1876 – Europe
- Hebeloma sinuosum (Fr. 1838) Quél. 1873
- Hebeloma smithii Quadr. 1987 – United Kingdom
- Hebeloma sociale Peck 1904
- Hebeloma solheimii A.H.Sm., V.S.Evenson & Mitchel 1983
- Hebeloma sordescens Vesterh. 1989 – United Kingdom
- Hebeloma sordidum Maire 1914
- Hebeloma spetsbergense Beker & U. Eberh. 2016
- Hebeloma spoliatum (Fr. 1838) Gillet 1876 – United Kingdom
- Hebeloma sporadicum A.H.Sm. 1938 – Michigan
- Hebeloma squamulosum Velen. 1920
- Hebeloma stanleyense A.H.Sm., V.S.Evenson & Mitchel 1983
- Hebeloma stenocystis J.Favre 1960
- Hebeloma sterlingii (Peck 1906) Murrill 1917
- Hebeloma suaveolens Velen. 1920
- Hebeloma subannulatum A.H.Sm., V.S.Evenson & Mitchel 1983
- Hebeloma subargillaceum A.H.Sm., V.S.Evenson & Mitchel 1983
- Hebeloma subaustrale Murrill 1946
- Hebeloma subboreale A.H.Sm., V.S.Evenson & Mitchel 1983
- Hebeloma subcaespitosum Bon 1978
- Hebeloma subcapitatum A.H.Sm., V.S.Evenson & Mitchel 1983
- Hebeloma subconcolor Bruchet 1970
- Hebeloma subfastibile Murrill 1945
- Hebeloma subfastigiatum A.H.Sm., V.S.Evenson & Mitchel 1983
- Hebeloma subhepaticum A.H.Sm., V.S.Evenson & Mitchel 1983
- Hebeloma subincarnatum Murrill 1912
- Hebeloma sublamellatum A.H.Sm., V.S.Evenson & Mitchel 1983
- Hebeloma submelinoides (Kühner) Kühner 1980 – United Kingdom
- Hebeloma subplatense Rick 1938
- Hebeloma subrimosum A.H.Sm., V.S.Evenson & Mitchel 1983
- Hebeloma subrubescens A.H.Sm., V.S.Evenson & Mitchel 1983
- Hebeloma substrophosum A.H.Sm., V.S.Evenson & Mitchel 1983
- Hebeloma subumbrinum A.H.Sm., V.S.Evenson & Mitchel 1983
- Hebeloma subvatricosoides Murrill 1946
- Hebeloma subviolaceum A.H.Sm., V.S.Evenson & Mitchel 1983
- Hebeloma syrjense P.Karst. 1879

== T ==
- Hebeloma tenuifolium Romagn. 1985
- Hebeloma theobrominum Quadr. 1987 – United Kingdom
- Hebeloma tomoeae S.Imai 1938
- Hebeloma trachysporum Petch 1925
- Hebeloma trinidadense A.H.Sm., V.S.Evenson & Mitchel 1983

== U ==
- Hebeloma urbanicola A.H.Sm., V.S.Evenson & Mitchel 1983
- Hebeloma utahense A.H.Sm., V.S.Evenson & Mitchel 1983

== V ==
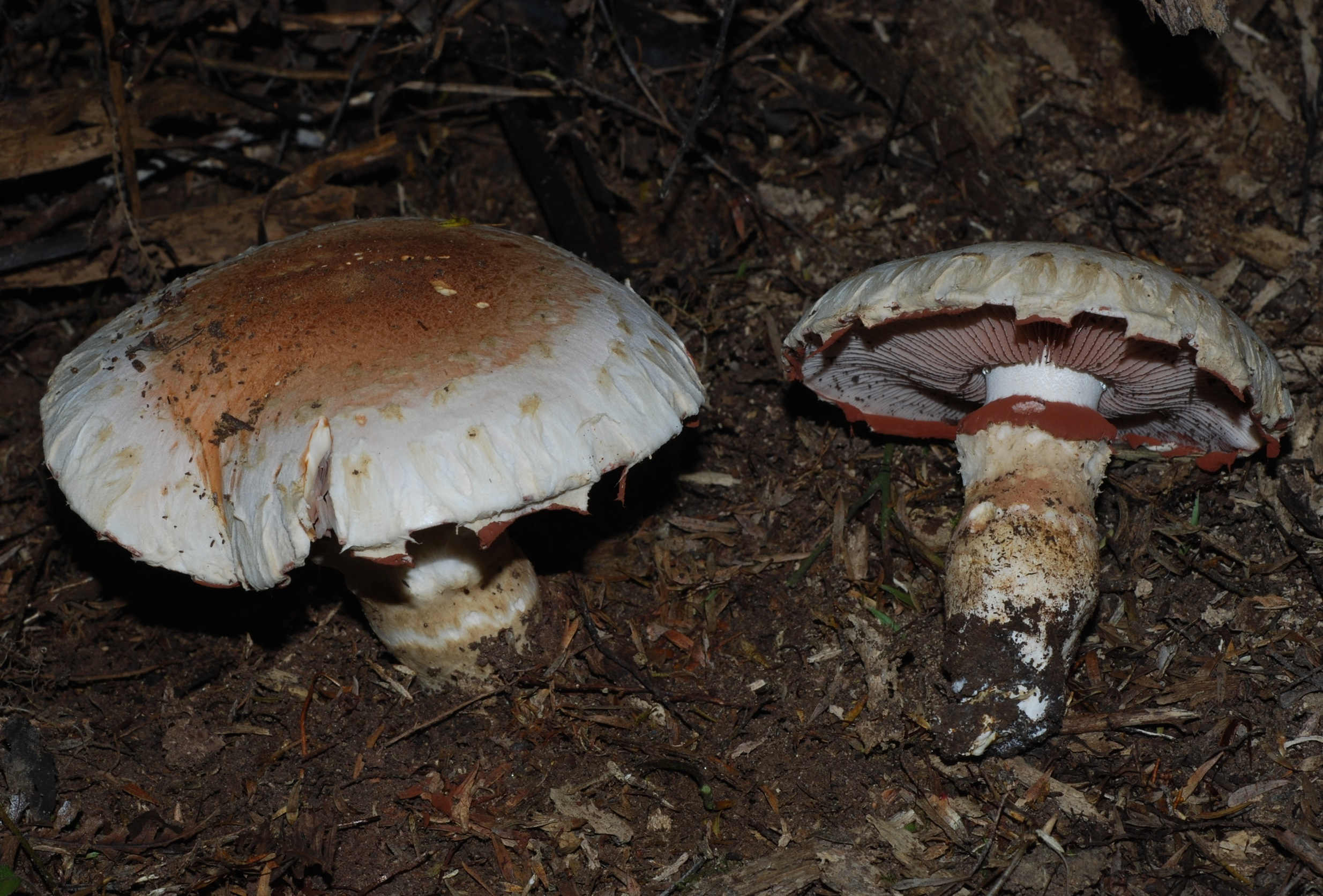
Hebeloma victoriense

- Hebeloma vaccinum Romagn. 1965 – Europe
- Hebeloma vatricosoides Murrill 1917
- Hebeloma vatricosum (Fr. 1818) Murrill 1917
- Hebeloma vejlense Vesterh. 2005
- Hebeloma velatum (Peck 1895) Peck 1910
- Hebeloma velutipes Bruchet 1970
- Hebeloma vernale Velen. 1920
- Hebeloma versipelle (Fr. 1838) Gillet 1876
- Hebeloma vesterholtii H.J.Beker & U.Eberh. (2010)
- Hebeloma victoriae (Cooke & Massee 1888) Pegler 1965 – Victoria
- Hebeloma victoriense A.A.Holland & Pegler 1983 – Victoria
- Hebeloma vinaceogriseum A.H.Sm., V.S.Evenson & Mitchel 1983
- Hebeloma vinaceoumbrinum A.H.Sm., V.S.Evenson & Mitchel 1983
- Hebeloma vinosophyllum Hongo (1965)
- Hebeloma virgatum Velen. 1920

== W ==
- Hebeloma weberi Murrill 1945
- Hebeloma wells-kemptoniae A.H.Sm., V.S.Evenson & Mitchel 1983
- Hebeloma wellsiae A.H.Sm., V.S.Evenson & Mitchel 1983
- Hebeloma westraliense Bougher, Tommerup & Malajczuk 1991 – Australia

== X ==
- Hebeloma xerophilum Rudn.-Jez. 1967
