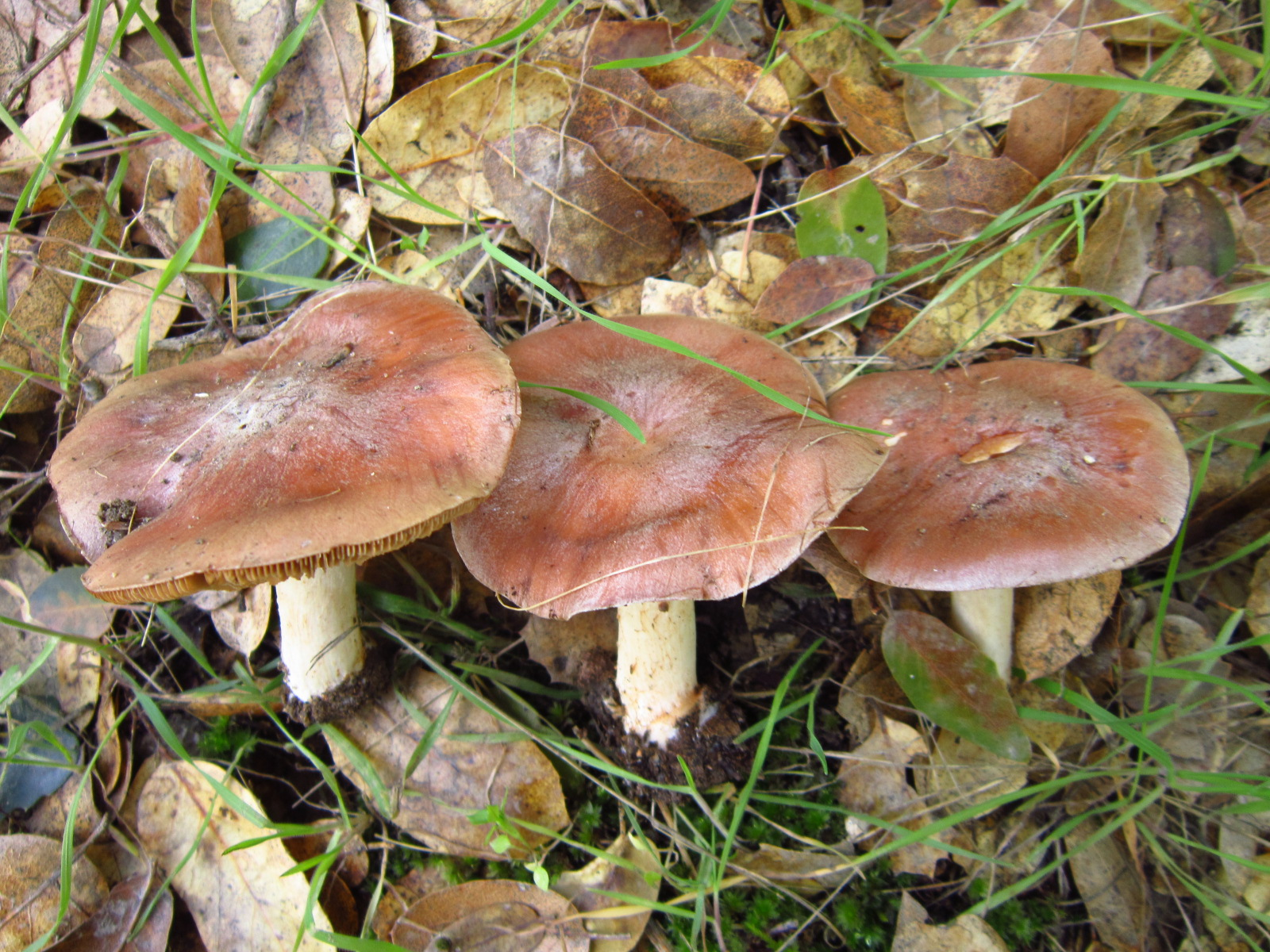

Scientific classification
- Domain: Eukaryota
- Kingdom: Fungi
- Division: Basidiomycota
- Class: Agaricomycetes
- Order: Agaricales
- Family: Hymenogastraceae
- Genus: Hebeloma
- Species: H. theobrominum

Binomial name
- Hebeloma theobrominum Quadr. (1987)

Synonyms
- Hebeloma truncatum var. pruinosum M.M.Moser (1986); Hebeloma theobrominum var. pruinosum (M.M.Moser) Quadr. (1989)

= Hebeloma theobrominum =

Species of fungus

Hebeloma theobrominum is a species of agaric fungus in the family Hymenogastraceae. Described as new to science in 1987, it is found in Europe. It is the type species of Hebeloma section Theobromina, which includes H. alboerumpens, H. erumpens, H. griseopruinatum, H. parvicystidiatum, H. plesiocistum, and H. vesterholtii.

== See also ==
- List of Hebeloma species
