= Hebeloma moseri =

Scientific classification
- Domain: Eukaryota
- Kingdom: Fungi
- Division: Basidiomycota
- Class: Agaricomycetes
- Order: Agaricales
- Family: Hymenogastraceae
- Genus: Hebeloma
- Species: H. moseri

Binomial name
- Hebeloma moseri Singer (1969)

Species of fungus

Hebeloma moseri is a species of agaric fungus in the family Hymenogastraceae. Found in Argentina, it was described as new to science by mycologist Rolf Singer in 1969. The specific epithet moseri honors Austrian mycologist Meinhard Moser.

== See also ==
- List of Hebeloma species
