= Hebeloma arenosum =

Scientific classification
- Domain: Eukaryota
- Kingdom: Fungi
- Division: Basidiomycota
- Class: Agaricomycetes
- Order: Agaricales
- Family: Hymenogastraceae
- Genus: Hebeloma
- Species: H. arenosum

Binomial name
- Hebeloma arenosum Burds., Macfall & M.A.Albers (1986)

Species of fungus

Hebeloma arenosum is a species of mushroom in the family Hymenogastraceae.

== Taxonomy ==
Described as new to science in 1986, it was first recorded in Wisconsin, where it was growing on sandy soil in a nursery bed containing Pinus resinosa (Norway pine).

== Distribution and habitat ==
It is found all over the Great Lakes region of the United States, where it is an ectomycorrhizal associate with spruce and pine grown in nursery beds.

== See also ==
- List of Hebeloma species
