= Hebeloma aestivale =

Scientific classification
- Domain: Eukaryota
- Kingdom: Fungi
- Division: Basidiomycota
- Class: Agaricomycetes
- Order: Agaricales
- Family: Hymenogastraceae
- Genus: Hebeloma
- Species: H. aestivale

Binomial name
- Hebeloma aestivale Vesterh. (1995)

Species of fungus

Hebeloma aestivale is a European species of mushroom in the family Hymenogastraceae.

== Description ==
Hebeloma aestivale is characterised by elongated, slightly clubbed cheilocystidia and dextrinoid spores where the outer perispore layer becomes loose.

== Taxonomy ==
It is in the Velutipes section of the genus Hebeloma.

== Distribution and habitat ==
Originally described from Denmark, H. aestivale has also been described in the United Kingdom, where it is one of the more commonly documented Hebeloma species.

== See also ==
- List of Hebeloma species
