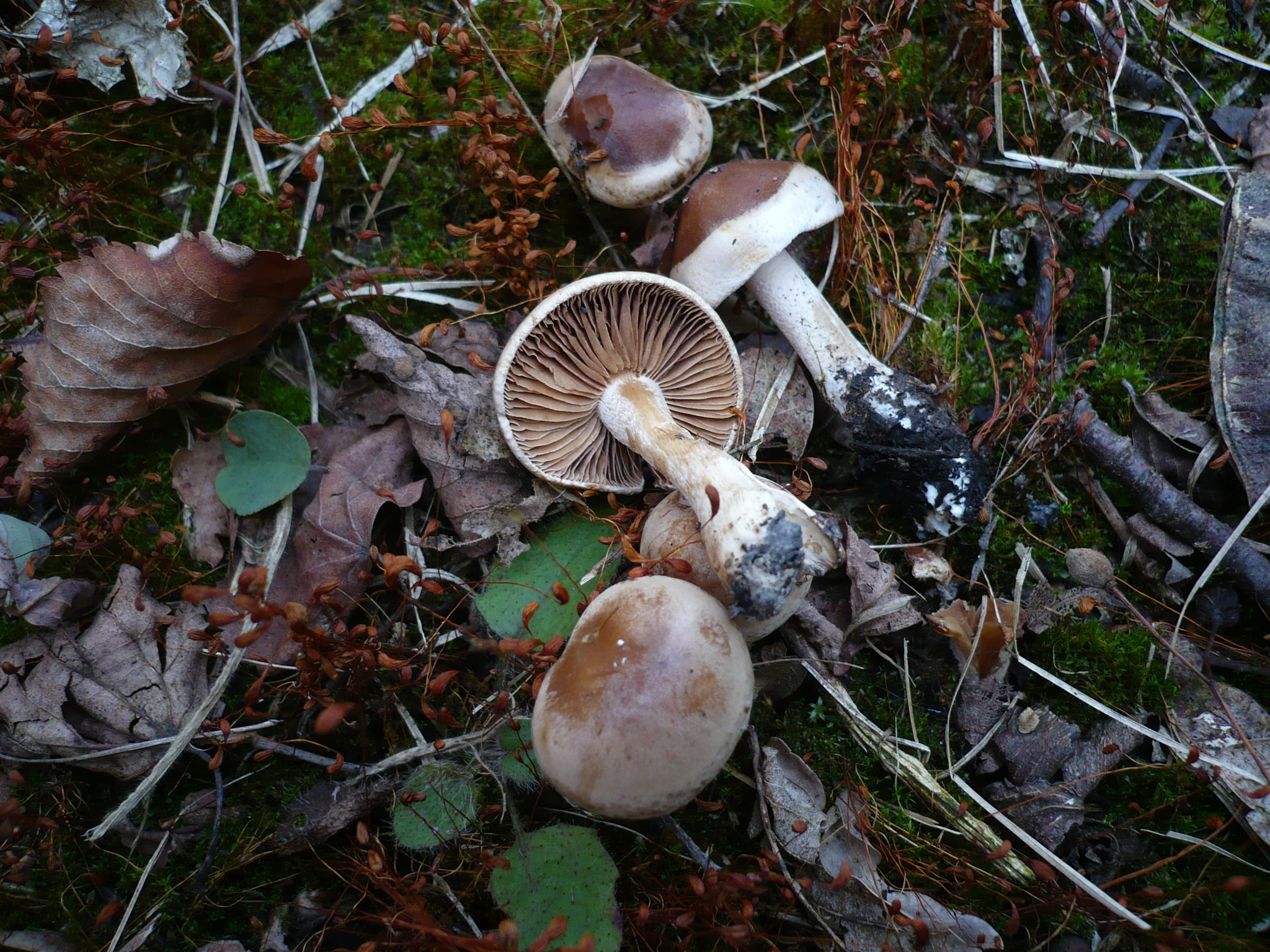
- A collection from the Czech Republic

Scientific classification
- Domain: Eukaryota
- Kingdom: Fungi
- Division: Basidiomycota
- Class: Agaricomycetes
- Order: Agaricales
- Family: Hymenogastraceae
- Genus: Hebeloma
- Species: H. anthracophilum

Binomial name
- Hebeloma anthracophilum Maire (1910)

Synonyms
- Agaricus birrus Fr. (1838); Hebelomatis anthracophilum (Maire) Locq. (1979)

= Hebeloma anthracophilum =

Species of fungus

Hebeloma anthracophilum is a species of mushroom in the family Hymenogastraceae. It was first described as Agaricus birruss by Elias Fries in 1838.

== See also ==
- List of Hebeloma species
