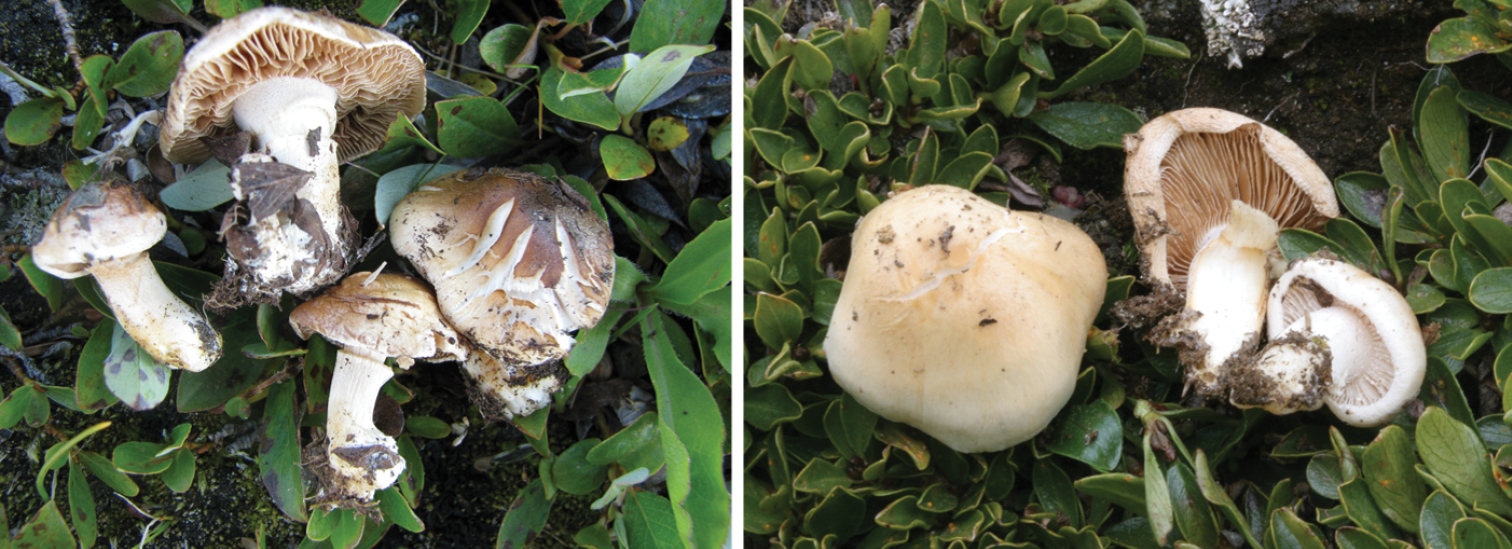

Scientific classification
- Domain: Eukaryota
- Kingdom: Fungi
- Division: Basidiomycota
- Class: Agaricomycetes
- Order: Agaricales
- Family: Hymenogastraceae
- Genus: Hebeloma
- Species: H. alpinum

Binomial name
- Hebeloma alpinum (J.Favre) Bruchet (1970)

Synonyms
- Hebeloma crustuliniforme var. alpinum J.Favre (1955); Hebeloma crustuliniforme f. alpinum (J.Favre) Vassilkov (1970); Hebelomatis alpinum (J.Favre) Locq. (1979)

= Hebeloma alpinum =

Species of fungus

Hebeloma alpinum is a species of mushroom in the family Hymenogastraceae. It was originally described from Switzerland by Favre as variety alpina of Hebeloma crustuliniforme; G. Bruchet raised it to species status in 1970.

== See also ==
- List of Hebeloma species
