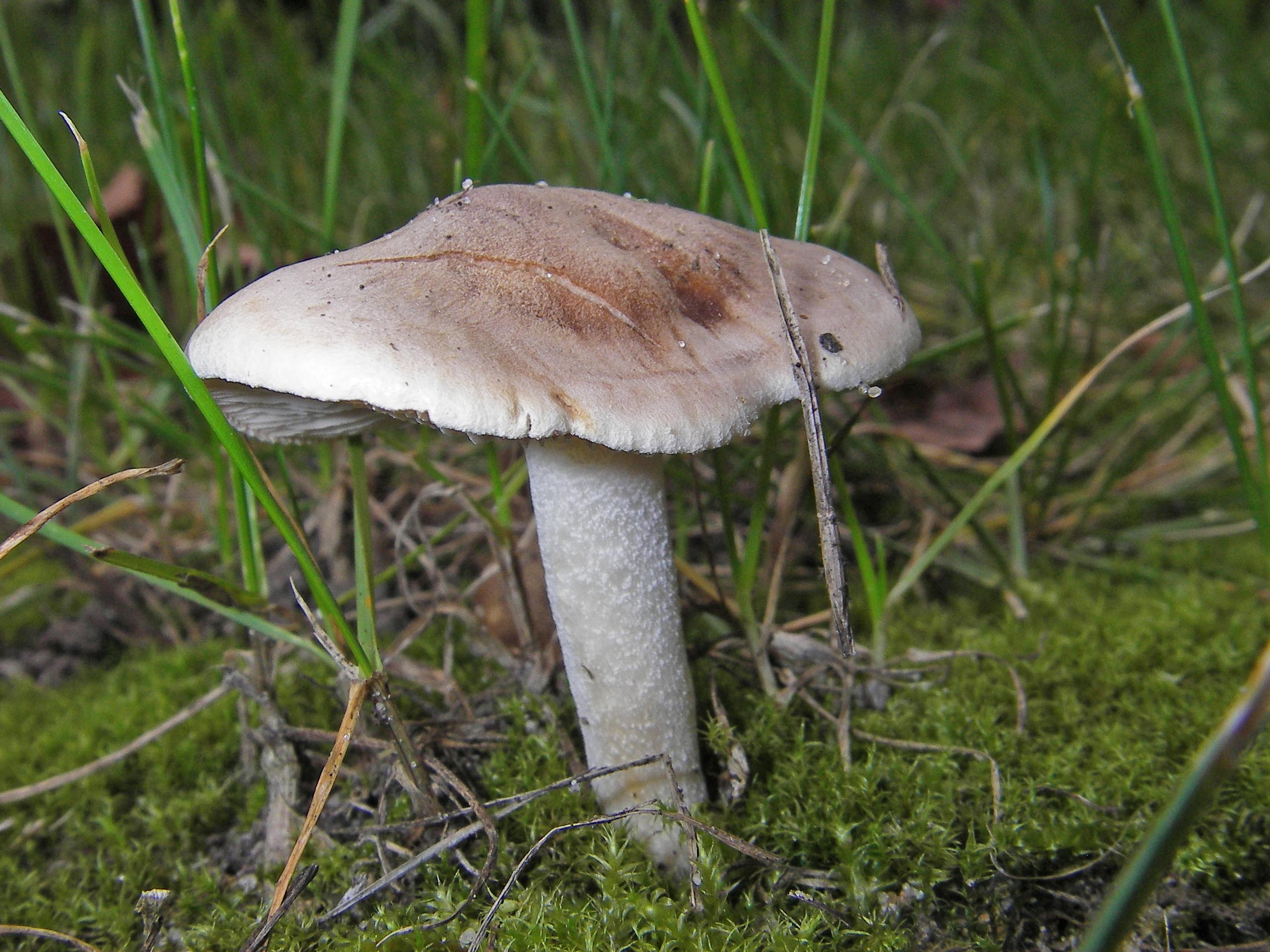

Scientific classification
- Domain: Eukaryota
- Kingdom: Fungi
- Division: Basidiomycota
- Class: Agaricomycetes
- Order: Agaricales
- Family: Hymenogastraceae
- Genus: Hebeloma
- Species: H. vejlense

Binomial name
- Hebeloma vejlense Vesterh. (2005)

= Hebeloma vejlense =

Species of fungus

Hebeloma vejlense is a species of agaric fungus in the family Hymenogastraceae. Discovered in Denmark growing on a lawn under Tilia, it was described as new to science in 2005.

== See also ==
- List of Hebeloma species
