= Hebeloma atrobrunneum =

Scientific classification
- Domain: Eukaryota
- Kingdom: Fungi
- Division: Basidiomycota
- Class: Agaricomycetes
- Order: Agaricales
- Family: Hymenogastraceae
- Genus: Hebeloma
- Species: H. atrobrunneum

Binomial name
- Hebeloma atrobrunneum Vesterh. (1989)

Species of fungus

Hebeloma atrobrunneum is a species of mushroom in the family Hymenogastraceae. Described as new to science in 1989, it was found on moist soil growing under Willow (Salix spp.) plants in Denmark.

== See also ==
- List of Hebeloma species
