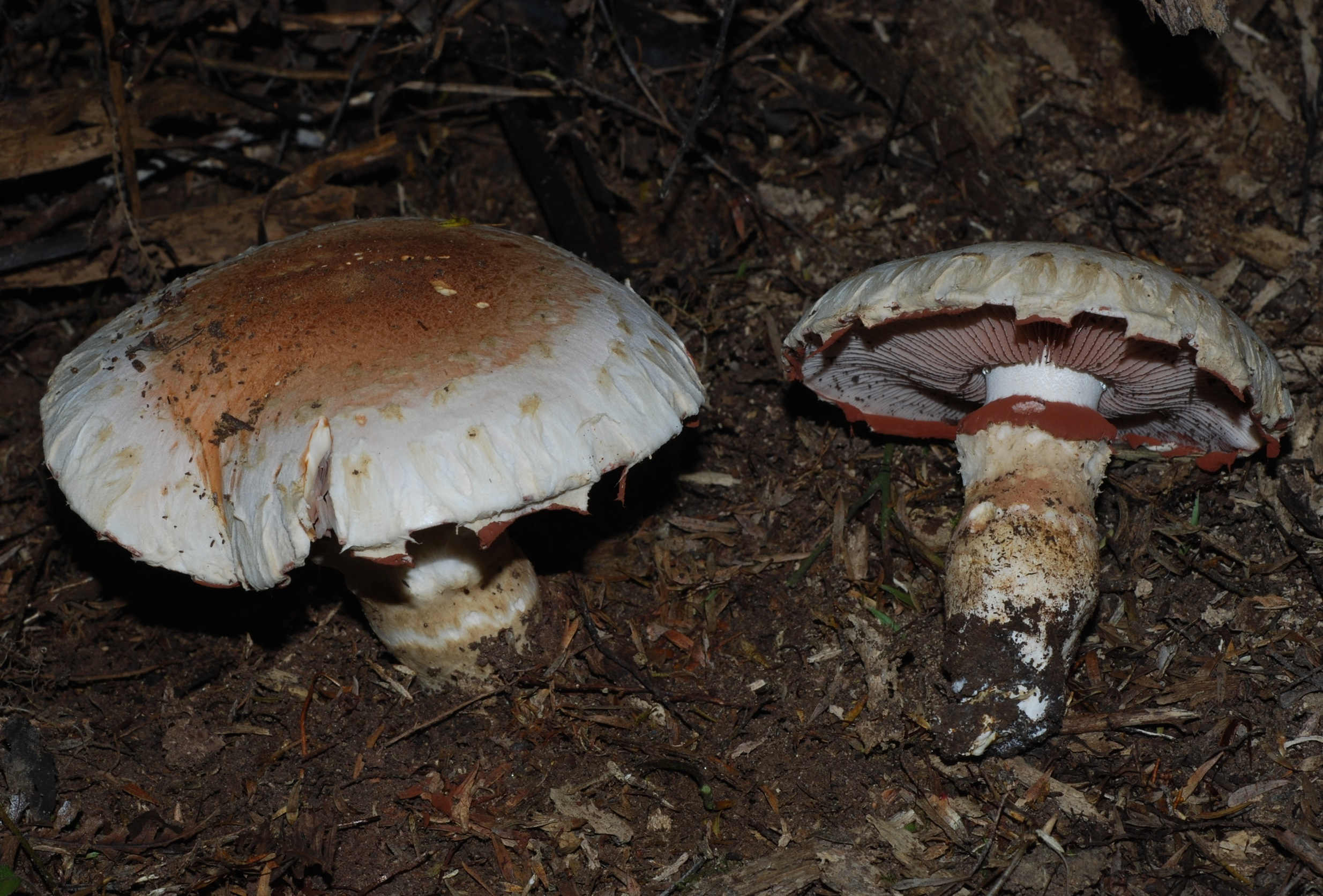

Scientific classification
- Domain: Eukaryota
- Kingdom: Fungi
- Division: Basidiomycota
- Class: Agaricomycetes
- Order: Agaricales
- Family: Hymenogastraceae
- Genus: Hebeloma
- Species: H. victoriense

Binomial name
- Hebeloma victoriense A.A.Holland & Pegler (1983)

= Hebeloma victoriense =

Species of fungus

Hebeloma victoriense is a species of mushroom in the family Hymenogastraceae. Originally described in 1983 based on specimens collected from Victoria, Australia, it is also found in New Zealand.

== See also ==
- List of Hebeloma species
