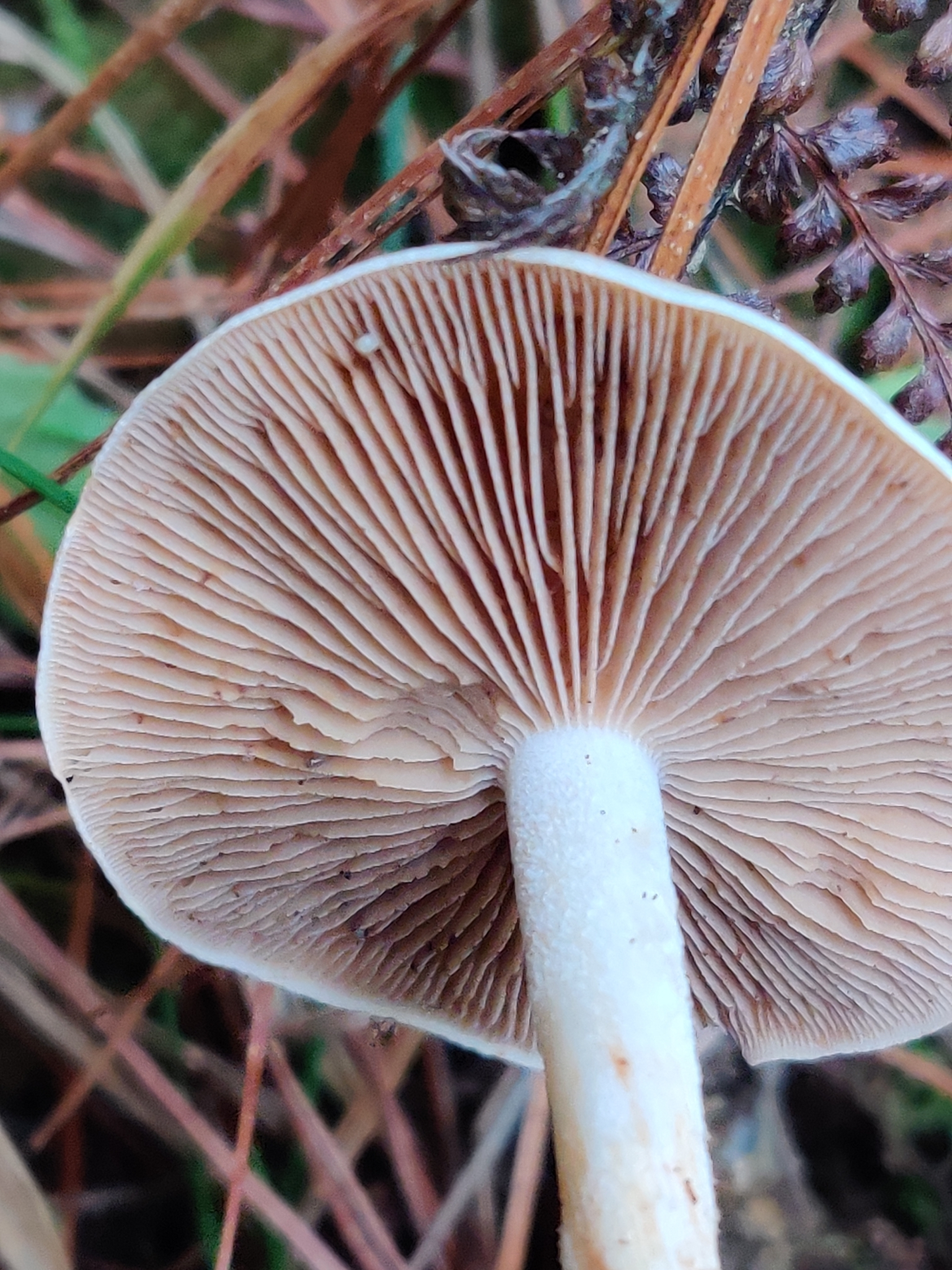

Scientific classification
- Kingdom: Fungi
- Division: Basidiomycota
- Class: Agaricomycetes
- Order: Agaricales
- Family: Hymenogastraceae
- Genus: Hebeloma
- Species: H. velutipes

Binomial name
- Hebeloma velutipes Bruchet

Synonyms
- Hebeloma bakeri Earle.

= Hebeloma velutipes =

Species of fungus

Hebeloma velutipes
- Mycological characteristics
- Gills on hymenium
- Cap is convex or umbonate
- Hymenium is adnate or sinuate
- Stipe is bare
- Spore print is brown
- Ecology is mycorrhizal
- Edibility is poisonous

Hebeloma velutipes, commonly known as the common poison pie, velvet foot hebeloma, or velvet foot poisonpie, is a species of mushroom in the family Hymenogastraceae.

== Description ==
The cap of Hebeloma velutipes is about 2-6 centimeters in diameter and can be convex or umbonate. Its color is variable, and it can be pale, white, or brown. The stipe is about 2–10 centimeters long and 0.4–1.6 centimeters wide, and fuzzy. It can have bulbous base. The gills can be adnexed or sinuate. The spore print is brown.

== Habitat and ecology ==
Hebeloma velutipes can be found in a wide variety of habitats, including forests and cities. It is very common, and can be found under both conifers and hardwoods.
