= Hebeloma olympianum =

Scientific classification
- Kingdom: Fungi
- Division: Basidiomycota
- Class: Agaricomycetes
- Order: Agaricales
- Family: Hymenogastraceae
- Genus: Hebeloma
- Species: H. olympianum

Binomial name
- Hebeloma olympianum A.H. Sm., V.S., Evenson & Mitchel

Species of fungus

Hebeloma olympianum
- Mycological characteristics
- Gills on hymenium
- Cap is convex or umbonate
- Hymenium is adnate or emarginate
- Stipe is bare
- Spore print is brown
- Ecology is mycorrhizal
- Edibility is unknown or poisonous

Hebeloma olympianum is a species of mushroom in the family Hymenogastraceae.

== Description ==
The cap of Hebeloma olympianum is about 1.5-5 centimeters in diameter. It is brown in color and convex or sometimes umbonate. The gills can be adnate, adnexed, or emarginate. They start out tan or beige, and become brown as the mushroom gets older. The stipe is about 2-10 centimeters long and 3 millimeters to 1 centimeter wide. The spore print is brown.

It can often be confused with the edible truffle, and the edibility of this fungi is unknown due to its rarity.

== Habitat and ecology ==
Hebeloma olympianum is found in Western North America, where it grows under both conifers and hardwoods. It is often found in scrubland, at campsites, and near forest trails.
