= Hebeloma angelesiense =

Scientific classification
- Kingdom: Fungi
- Division: Basidiomycota
- Class: Agaricomycetes
- Order: Agaricales
- Family: Hymenogastraceae
- Genus: Hebeloma
- Species: H. angelesiense

Binomial name
- Hebeloma angelesiense A.H. Sm., V.S. Evenson & Mitchel

Species of fungus

Hebeloma angelesiense Mycological characteristics
- Gills on hymenium
- Cap is convex or umbonate
- Hymenium is emarginate or adnate
- Stipe has a cortina
- Spore print is yellow-brown
- Ecology is mycorrhizal
- Edibility is unknown or poisonous

Hebeloma angelesiense is a species of mushroom in the family Hymenogastraceae.

== Description ==
The cap of Hebeloma angelesiense is about 2-12 centimeters in diameter. It can be orangish or brownish. The gills can be emarginate, adnate, or adnexed, and are brown in color. The stipe is about 5-15 centimeters long and 0.5-1.5 centimeters wide. It can taper downward, and is usually fibrillose. The spore print is yellowish brown.

== Habitat and ecology ==
Hebeloma angelesiense is found in coniferous forests in North America. It is usually found under douglas fir.
