= Hebeloma circinans =

Scientific classification
- Kingdom: Fungi
- Division: Basidiomycota
- Class: Agaricomycetes
- Order: Agaricales
- Family: Hymenogastraceae
- Genus: Hebeloma
- Species: H. circinans

Binomial name
- Hebeloma circinans (Quél.) Sacc.

Species of fungus

The fruiting bodies of Hebeloma circinans growing in grass.

Hebeloma circinans is a species of mushroom in the family Hymenogastraceae.
