= Hebeloma domardianum =

Scientific classification
- Kingdom: Fungi
- Division: Basidiomycota
- Class: Agaricomycetes
- Order: Agaricales
- Family: Hymenogastraceae
- Genus: Hebeloma
- Species: H. domardianum

Binomial name
- Hebeloma domardianum (Maire) Beker, U. Eberh. & Vesterh.

Species of fungus

Hebeloma domardianum is a species of mushroom in the family Hymenogastraceae.
