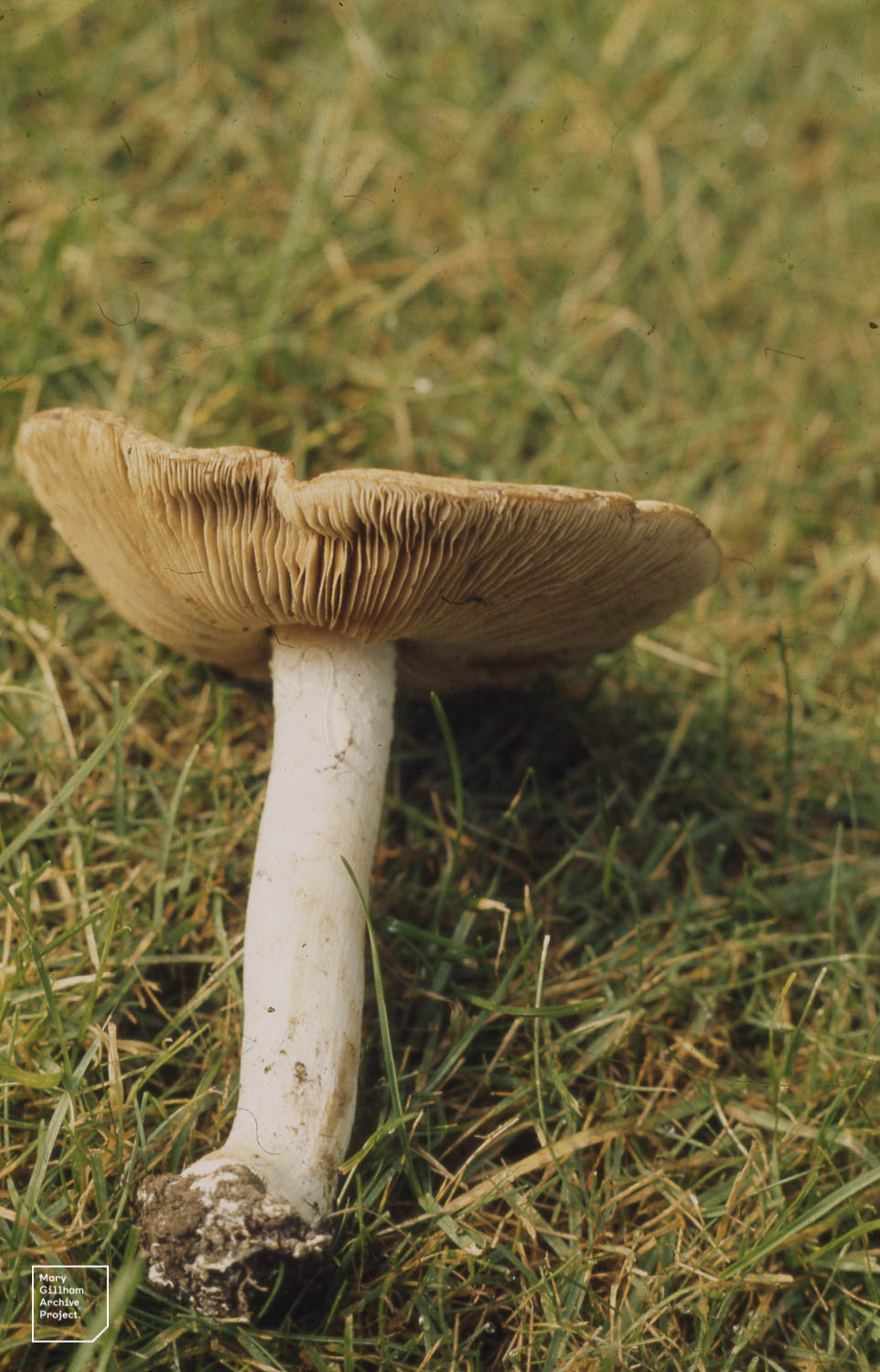

Scientific classification
- Domain: Eukaryota
- Kingdom: Fungi
- Division: Basidiomycota
- Class: Agaricomycetes
- Order: Agaricales
- Family: Hymenogastraceae
- Genus: Hebeloma
- Species: H. sinuosum

Binomial name
- Hebeloma sinuosum (Fr.) Quél. (1873)

Synonyms
- Agaricus sinuosus Fr. (1838); Inocybe sinuosa (Fr.) P.Karst. (1879)

= Hebeloma sinuosum =

Species of fungus

Hebeloma sinuosum is a species of agaric fungus in the family Hymenogastraceae. First described as Agaricus sinuosus by Elias Magnus Fries in 1838, it was later transferred to Hebeloma by Lucien Quélet in 1893. It is native to the United Kingdom.
