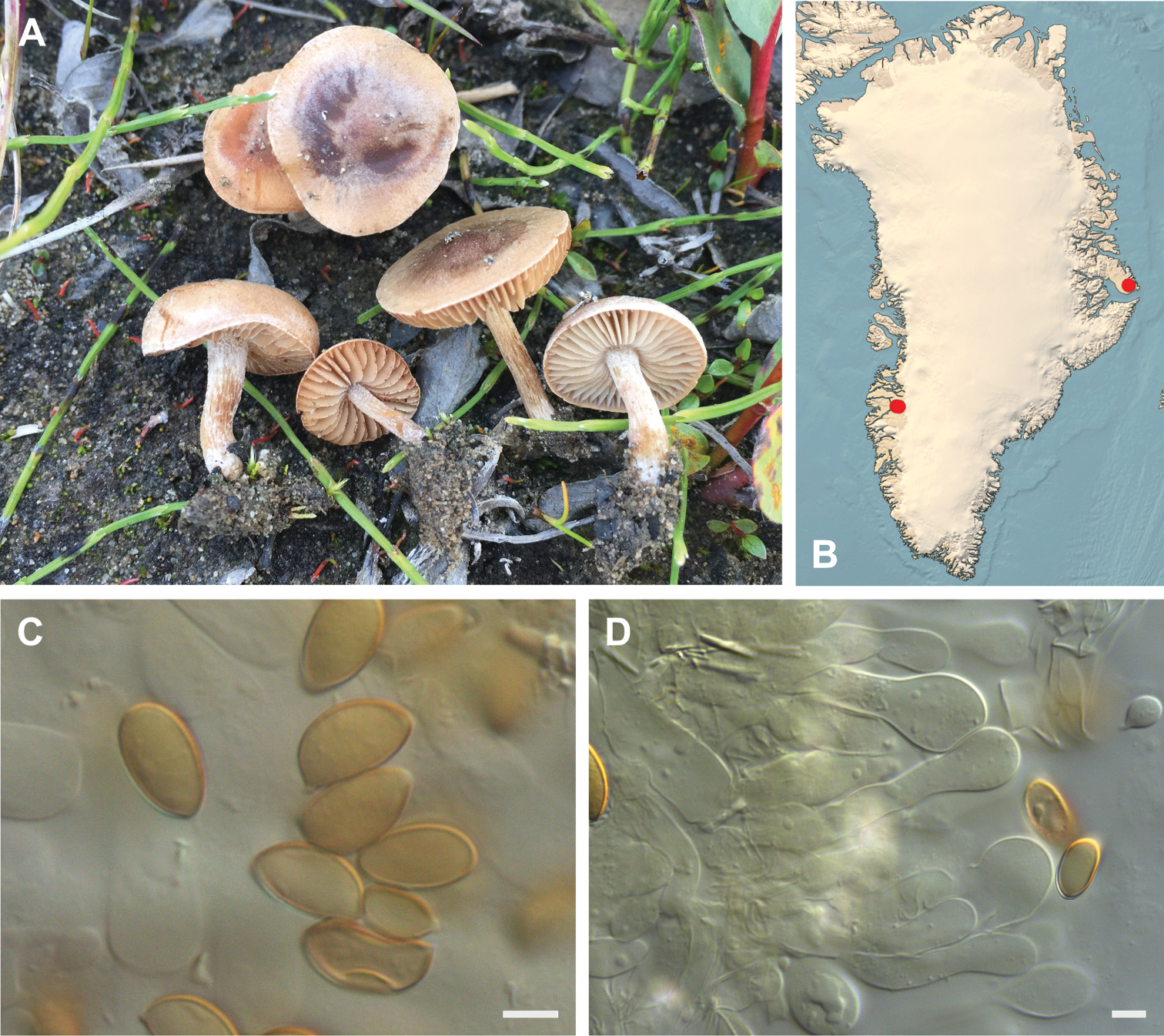
- H. louiseae A SAE-2017.125 B distribution of cited collections C spores ×1600 and D cheilocystidia ×1000 in Melzer's reagent. Scale bars: 5 µm

Scientific classification
- Kingdom: Fungi
- Division: Basidiomycota
- Class: Agaricomycetes
- Order: Agaricales
- Family: Hymenogastraceae
- Genus: Hebeloma
- Species: H. louiseae

Binomial name
- Hebeloma louiseae Beker, Vesterh. & U.Eberh. (2016)

= Hebeloma louiseae =

Species of fungus

Hebeloma louiseae is a species of mushroom in the family Hymenogastraceae. The species was first found in Svalbard and named as a distinct species of Hebeloma in 2016. It has subsequently been collected in Greenland.
