= Hebeloma psammophilum =

Scientific classification
- Kingdom: Fungi
- Division: Basidiomycota
- Class: Agaricomycetes
- Order: Agaricales
- Family: Hymenogastraceae
- Genus: Hebeloma
- Species: H. psammophilum

Binomial name
- Hebeloma psammophilum Bon

Species of fungus

Hebeloma psammophilum is a species of mushroom in the family Hymenogastraceae.
