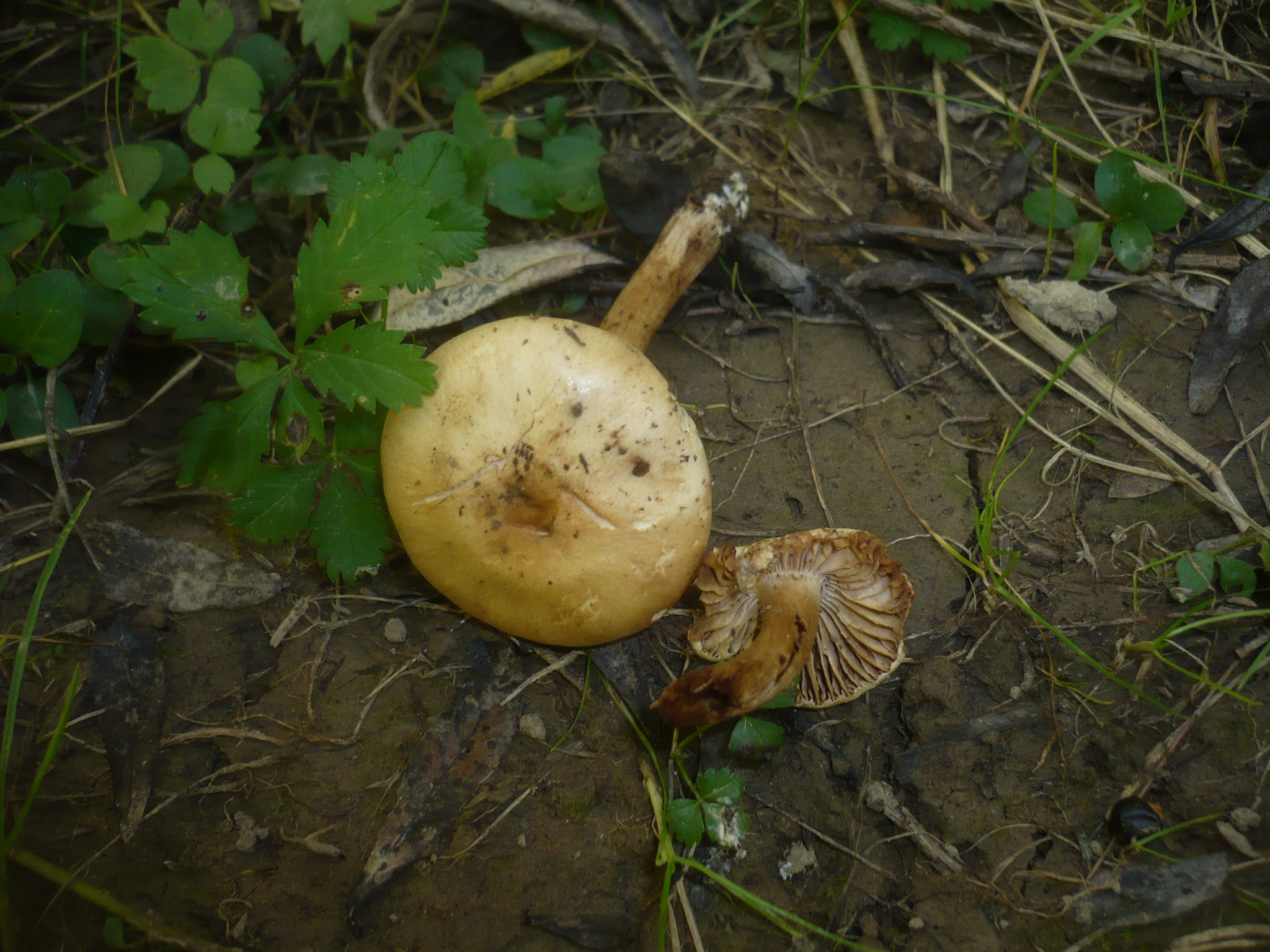

Scientific classification
- Kingdom: Fungi
- Division: Basidiomycota
- Class: Agaricomycetes
- Order: Agaricales
- Family: Hymenogastraceae
- Genus: Hebeloma
- Species: H. pallidoluctuosum

Binomial name
- Hebeloma pallidoluctuosum Gröger & Zschiesch.

= Hebeloma pallidoluctuosum =

Species of fungus

Hebeloma pallidoluctuosum is a species of mushroom in the family Hymenogastraceae.
