= Hebeloma syrjense =

Scientific classification
- Kingdom: Fungi
- Division: Basidiomycota
- Class: Agaricomycetes
- Order: Agaricales
- Family: Hymenogastraceae
- Genus: Hebeloma
- Species: H. syrjense

Binomial name
- Hebeloma syrjense P.Karst. (1879)

Species of fungus

Hebeloma syrjense is a species of mushroom in the family Hymenogastraceae. It has been noted to grow at the sites of decomposing bodies at the body farm in Tennessee.
