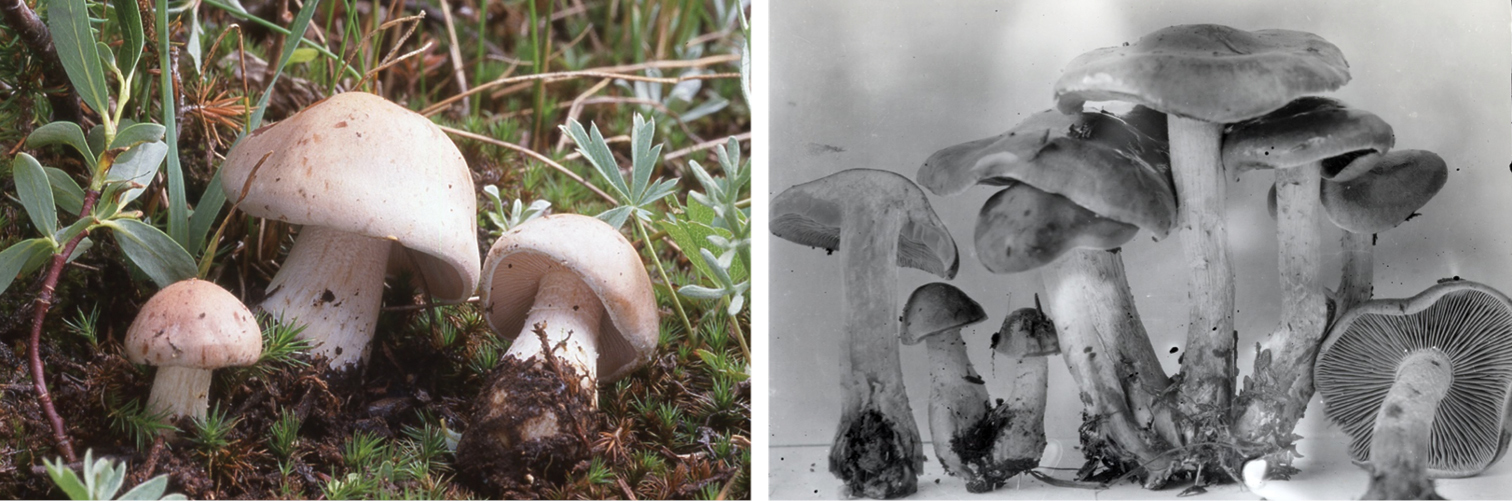

Scientific classification
- Kingdom: Fungi
- Division: Basidiomycota
- Class: Agaricomycetes
- Order: Agaricales
- Family: Hymenogastraceae
- Genus: Hebeloma
- Species: H. avellaneum

Binomial name
- Hebeloma avellaneum Kauffman

= Hebeloma avellaneum =

Species of fungus

Hebeloma avellaneum Mycological characteristics
- Gills on hymenium
- Cap is convex or umbonate
- Hymenium is emarginate
- Stipe is bare
- Spore print is brown
- Ecology is mycorrhizal
- Edibility is unknown or poisonous

Hebeloma avellaneum is a species of mushroom in the family Hymenogastraceae.

== Description ==
The cap of Hebeloma avellaneum is about 3-7 centimeters in diameter. It is brown in color and is convex or umbonate. The gills are usually emarginate, though rarely decurrent. They can be pale, tan, or brown. The stipe is 3-8 centimeters long, 7-15 millimeters wide, and white in color. The spore print is brown.

== Habitat and ecology ==
Hebeloma avellaneum is grows under both hardwood and conifer trees. It is found in both North America and Asia. It has been recorded from as far north as southwestern Nunavut.
