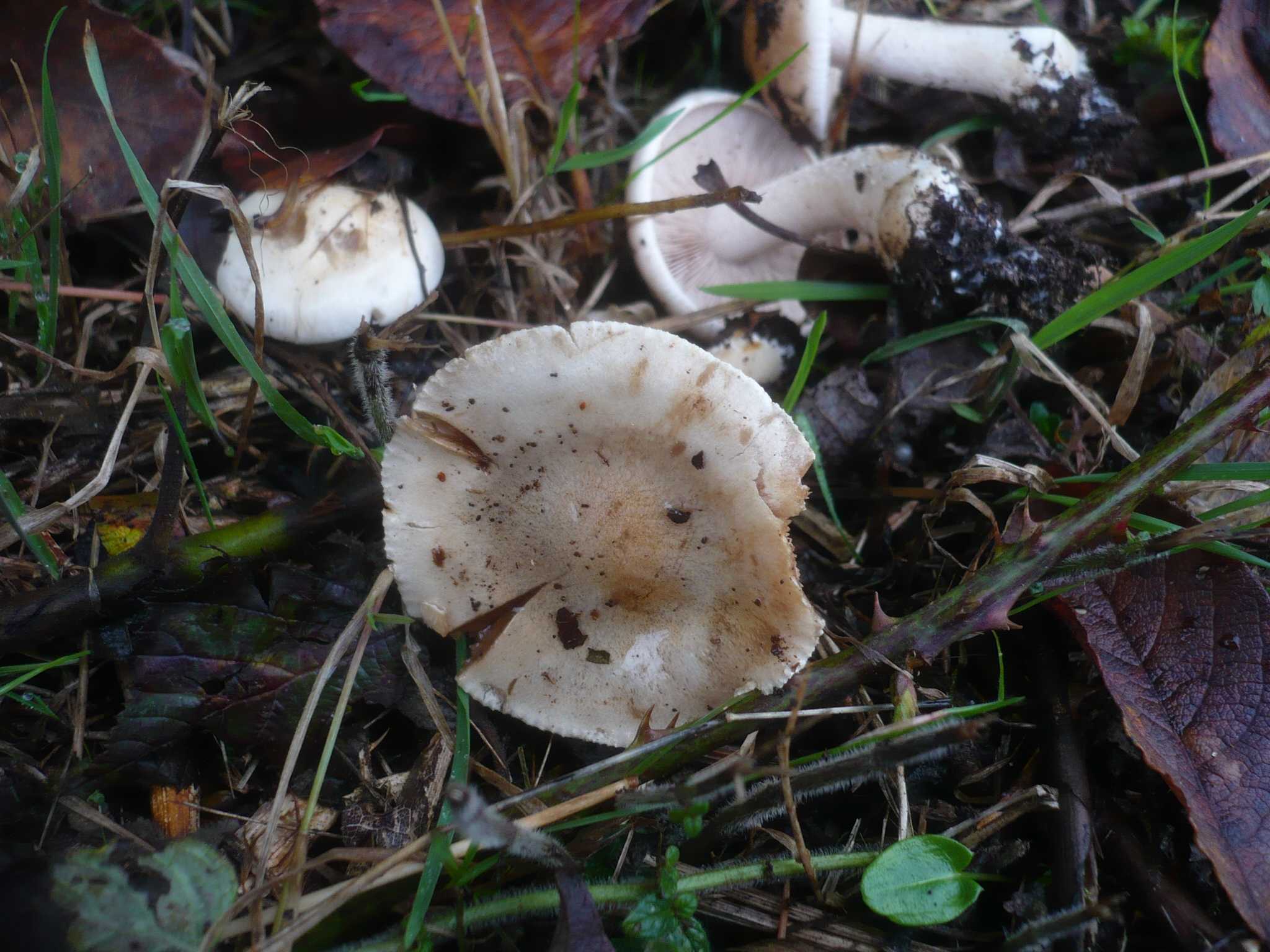

Scientific classification
- Domain: Eukaryota
- Kingdom: Fungi
- Division: Basidiomycota
- Class: Agaricomycetes
- Order: Agaricales
- Family: Hymenogastraceae
- Genus: Hebeloma
- Species: H. sordescens

Binomial name
- Hebeloma sordescens Vesterh. (1989)

= Hebeloma sordescens =

Species of fungus

Hebeloma sordescens is a species of mushroom in the family Hymenogastraceae. The species was described as new to science in 1989.
