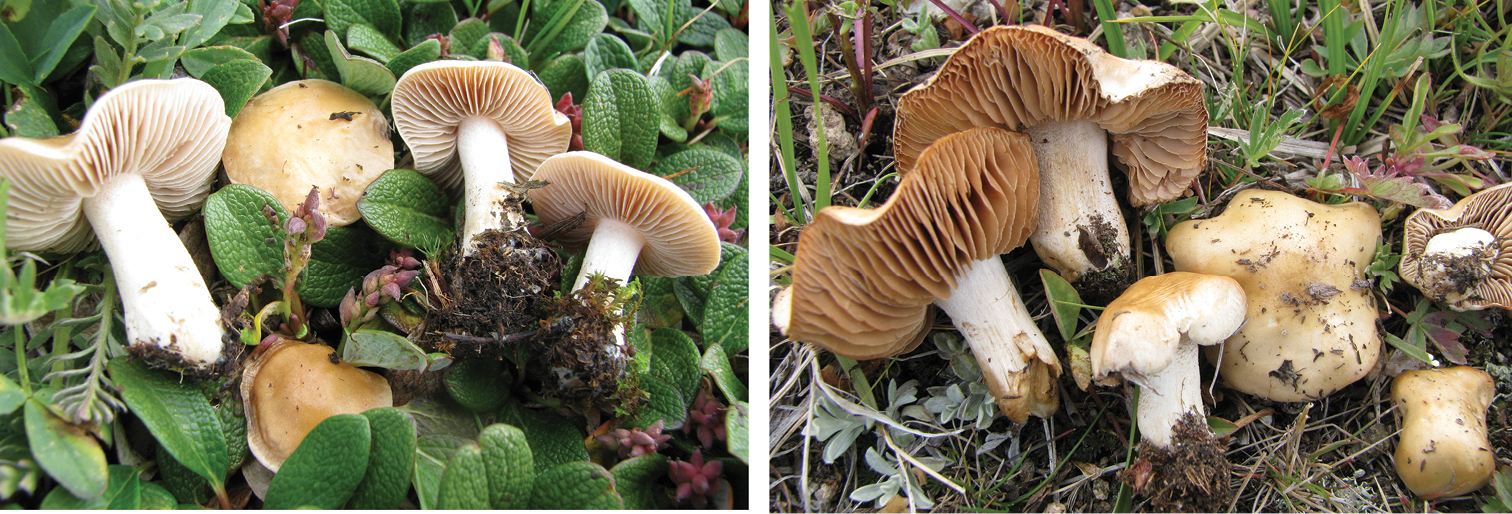

Scientific classification
- Kingdom: Fungi
- Division: Basidiomycota
- Class: Agaricomycetes
- Order: Agaricales
- Family: Hymenogastraceae
- Genus: Hebeloma
- Species: H. hiemale

Binomial name
- Hebeloma hiemale Bres.

= Hebeloma hiemale =

Species of fungus

Hebeloma hiemale is a species of mushroom in the family Hymenogastraceae.

== Description ==
Hebeloma hiemale has a pale brownish or buff cap that can be convex or umbonate. The cap is about 1.5-5 centimeters in diameter. The stipe is about 3-8 centimeters long and up to 1.5 centimeters wide. The gills are sinuate and start out pale, becoming brown in age. The spore print is brown. This mushroom smells slightly of radishes.

== Habitat and ecology ==
Hebeloma hiemale is a mycorrhizal fungus that forms symbiotic relationships with both conifers and hardwoods. It fruits from spring until fall, and sometimes into winter if it is warm enough.
