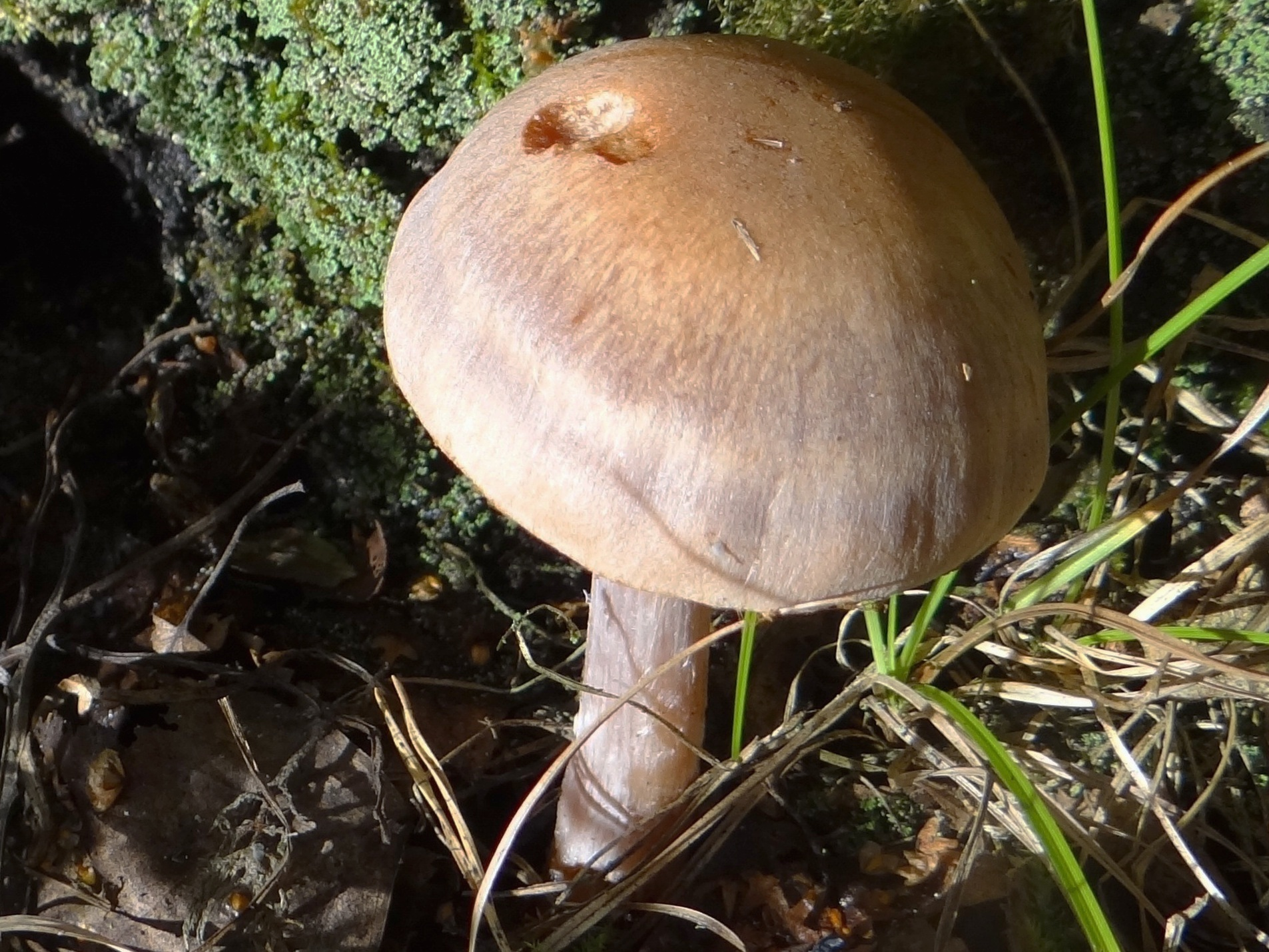

Scientific classification
- Kingdom: Fungi
- Division: Basidiomycota
- Class: Agaricomycetes
- Order: Agaricales
- Family: Hymenogastraceae
- Genus: Hebeloma
- Species: H. sacchariolens

Binomial name
- Hebeloma sacchariolens Quél.

= Hebeloma sacchariolens =

Species of fungus

Hebeloma sacchariolens
- Mycological characteristics
- Gills on hymenium
- Cap is convex or umbonate
- Hymenium is adnate or sinuate
- Stipe is bare
- Spore print is brown
- Ecology is mycorrhizal
- Edibility is poisonous

Hebeloma sacchariolens, commonly known as the sweet poisonpie, or sweet-scented poison pie, is a species of mushroom in the family Hymenogastraceae.

== Description ==
The cap of Hebeloma sacchariolens is about 1.5-6 centimeters in diameter and can be convex or umbonate. It can be whitish, pale, buff, or brown in color. The stipe is about 2.2-8 centimeters long and 0.39-0.85 centimeters wide. It is fibrillose. The gills are buff to brown, and can be adnate or sinuate. The spore print is brown. This mushroom is reported to have a unique odor. In Noah Siegel and Christian Schwarz's book Mushrooms of Cascadia, it is described as "Sweet and chemical, often like grape soda or burnt sugar, or with floral tones." The specific epithet "sacchariolens" means "sugary smelling", and refers to the mushroom's burnt sugar like scent.

== Habitat and ecology ==
Hebeloma sacchariolens is found on the ground under both conifers and hardwoods.
