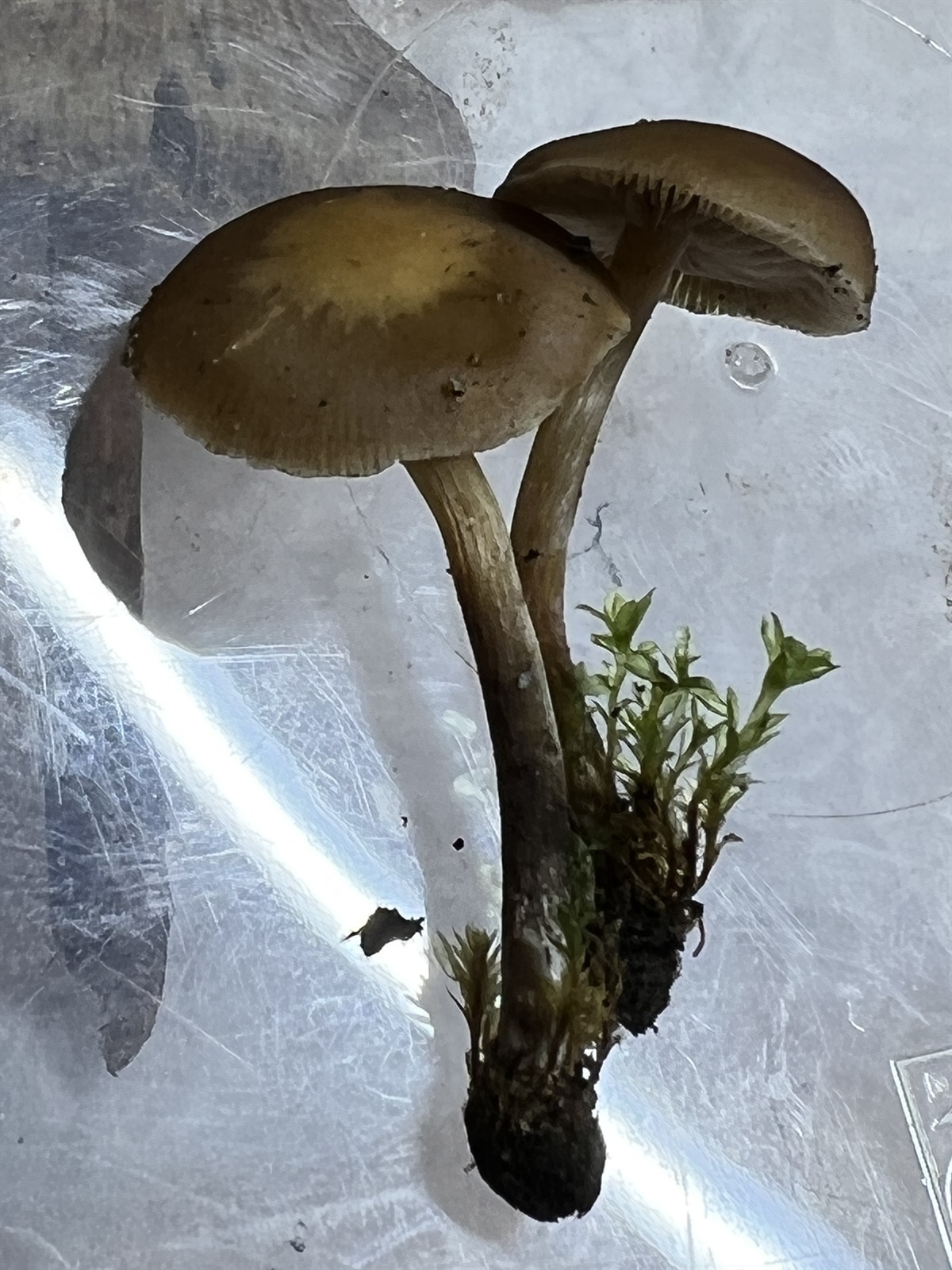

Scientific classification
- Kingdom: Fungi
- Division: Basidiomycota
- Class: Agaricomycetes
- Order: Agaricales
- Family: Hymenogastraceae
- Genus: Hebeloma
- Species: H. pseudoamarescens

Binomial name
- Hebeloma pseudoamarescens (Kühner & Romagn.) P. Collin

= Hebeloma pseudoamarescens =

Species of fungus

Hebeloma pseudoamarescens is a species of mushroom in the family Hymenogastraceae.
