= Hebeloma praeolidum =

Scientific classification
- Kingdom: Fungi
- Division: Basidiomycota
- Class: Agaricomycetes
- Order: Agaricales
- Family: Hymenogastraceae
- Genus: Hebeloma
- Species: H. praeolidum

Binomial name
- Hebeloma praeolidum A.H. Sm., V.S. Everson & Mitchel

Species of fungus

Hebeloma praeolidum
- Mycological characteristics
- Gills on hymenium
- Cap is convex or umbonate
- Hymenium is adnate or sinuate
- Stipe is bare
- Spore print is brown
- Ecology is mycorrhizal
- Edibility is poisonous

Hebeloma praeolidum is a species of mushroom in the family Hymenogastraceae. It is found in the Pacific Northwest.

== Description ==
The cap of Hebeloma praeolidum is about 1.5-5 centimeters in diameter, and is orangish, ochre, or brownish in color. The gills can be brown or beige in color, and can be adnate, emarginate, or occasionally adnexed. The stipe is about 2-9 centimeters long and 3-8 millimeters wide, and can be fibrillose or powdery. A cortina is present. Heboloma praeolidum has a brown spore print.

== Habitat and ecology ==
Hebeloma sacchariolens fruits during fall in conifer forests.
