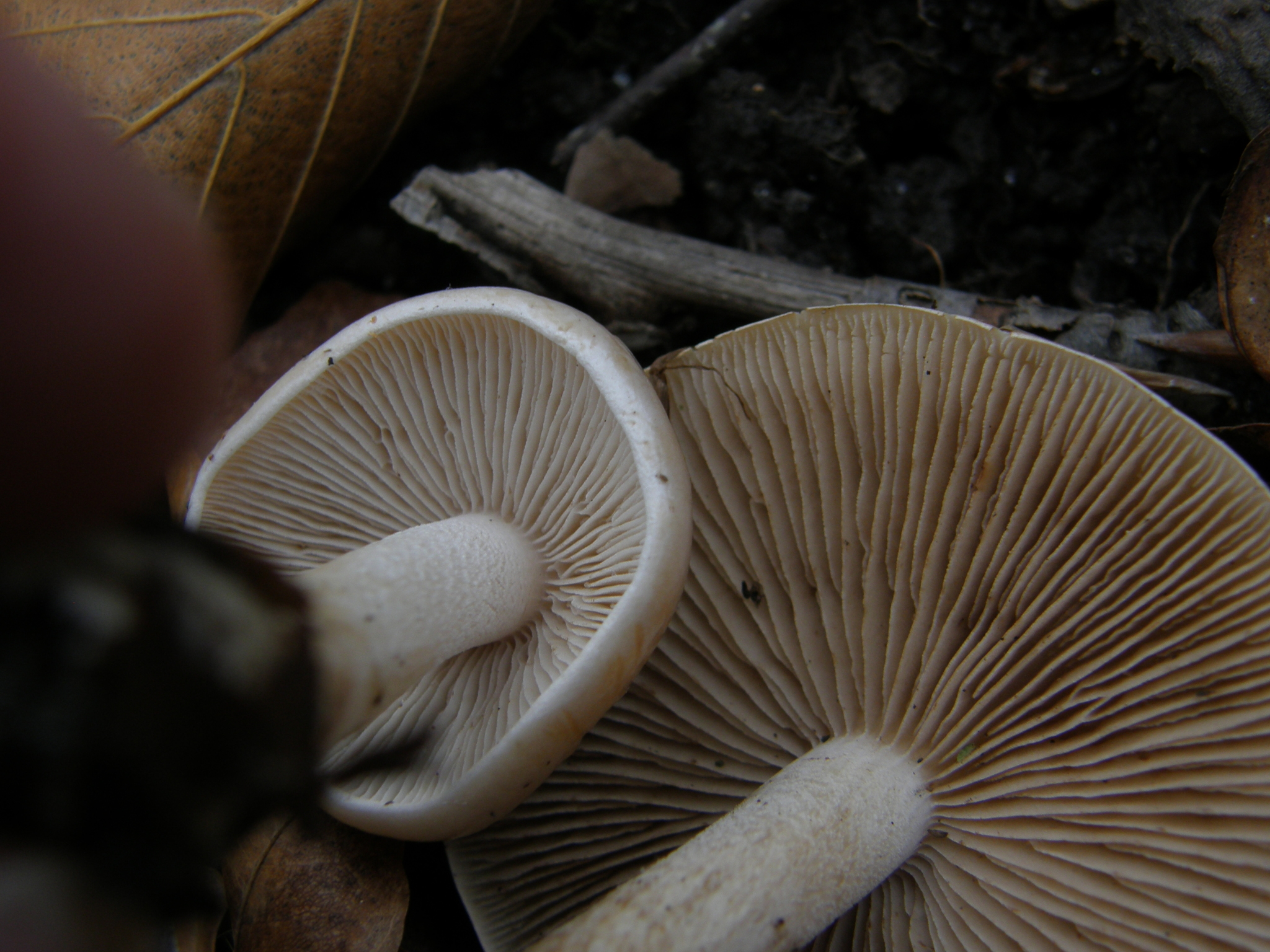

Scientific classification
- Kingdom: Fungi
- Division: Basidiomycota
- Class: Agaricomycetes
- Order: Agaricales
- Family: Hymenogastraceae
- Genus: Hebeloma
- Species: H. cavipes

Binomial name
- Hebeloma cavipes Huijsman (1961)

Synonyms
- Hebelomatis cavipes (Huijsman) Locq. 1979; Hebeloma lutense Romagn. 1965

= Hebeloma cavipes =

Species of fungus

Hebeloma cavipes
- Mycological characteristics
- Gills on hymenium
- Cap is convex or umbonate
- Hymenium is emarginate
- Stipe is bare
- Spore print is olive-brown
- Ecology is mycorrhizal
- Edibility is poisonous

Hebeloma cavipes is a species of mushroom in the family Hymenogastraceae.

== Description ==
Pileus: 1.5–5.8 centimetres (1/2–2 1/4 inches) diameter, cap convex and sometimes umbonate, slightly viscid. Cap colour yellow brown to cinnamon to chestnut or even dark brick, sometimes with a pale but strongly coloured zone and finally pinkish buff to cream to almost white near de margin. Disc zonate. Margin sometimes involute and slightly scalloped, but usually straight. Lamellae emarginated, spaced moderately; colour cream or brown when young, later sepia as spores mature; edge fimbriated and paler than lamellae; with droplets. Lamellules frequent.

Stipe central, sometimes cylindrical but usually clavate and subbulbous, white to leather-tan, usually discoloring to brown with age. Stipe surface pruinose to floccose in the apex. Cortina not observed. Smell raphanoid with cocoa hints. Taste raphanoid to bitter.

Spore deposit brownish olive to umber. Spores amygdaloid with a small apiculus. Size 9.2–11.7 × 5.5–6.6 μm.
