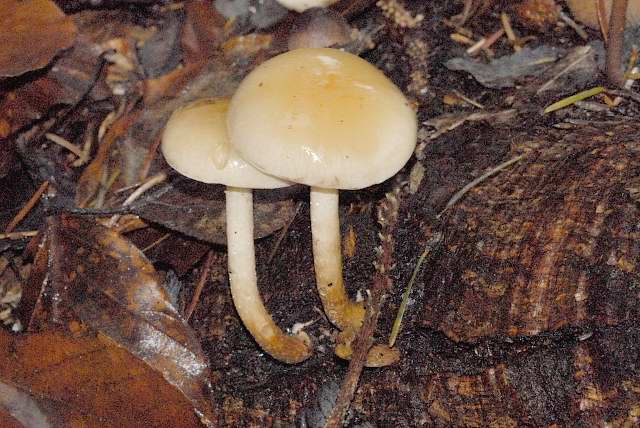

Scientific classification
- Kingdom: Fungi
- Division: Basidiomycota
- Class: Agaricomycetes
- Order: Agaricales
- Family: Hymenogastraceae
- Genus: Hebeloma
- Species: H. leucosarx

Binomial name
- Hebeloma leucosarx P.D. Orton

= Hebeloma leucosarx =

Species of mushroom

Hebeloma leucosarx is a species of mushroom in the family Hymenogastraceae.

H. leucosarx is found across a wide spectrum of habitats, from dry to wet and from soil that is calcareous and humus-poor to acidic and humus-rich. It is mostly found under deciduous trees but can occasionally be spotted under coniferous trees.
