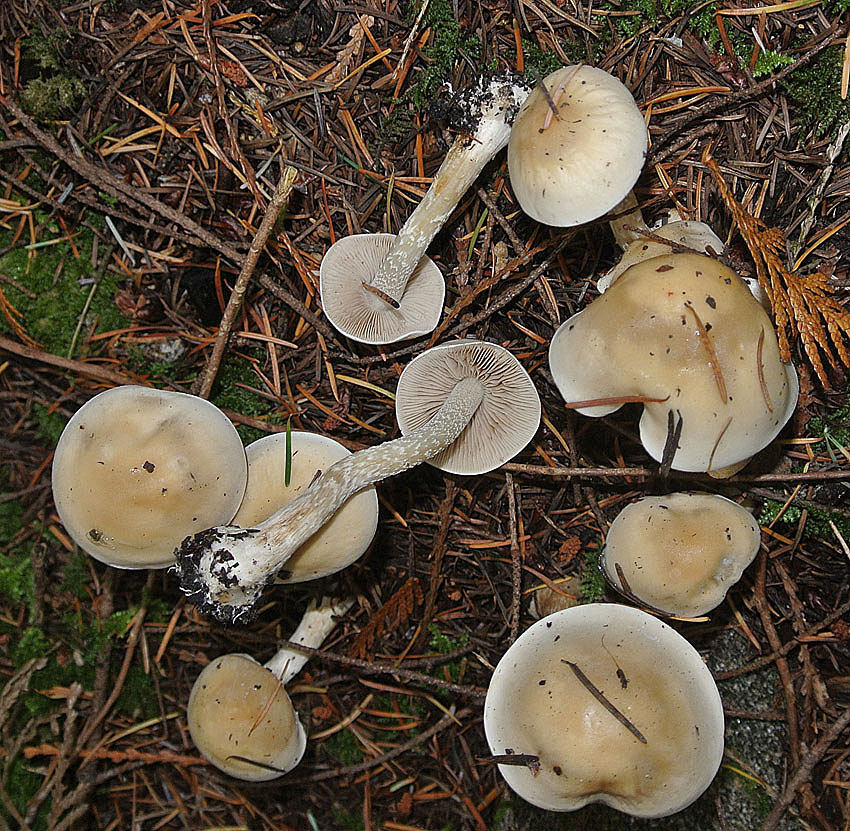

Scientific classification
- Domain: Eukaryota
- Kingdom: Fungi
- Division: Basidiomycota
- Class: Agaricomycetes
- Order: Agaricales
- Family: Hymenogastraceae
- Genus: Hebeloma
- Species: H. incarnatulum

Binomial name
- Hebeloma incarnatulum A.H. Sm.

= Hebeloma incarnatulum =

Species of fungus

Hebeloma incarnatulum is a species of mushroom in the family Hymenogastraceae. It occurs in Europe and around the North American Great Lakes, often in mossy areas. It is similar to H. crustuliniforme.
