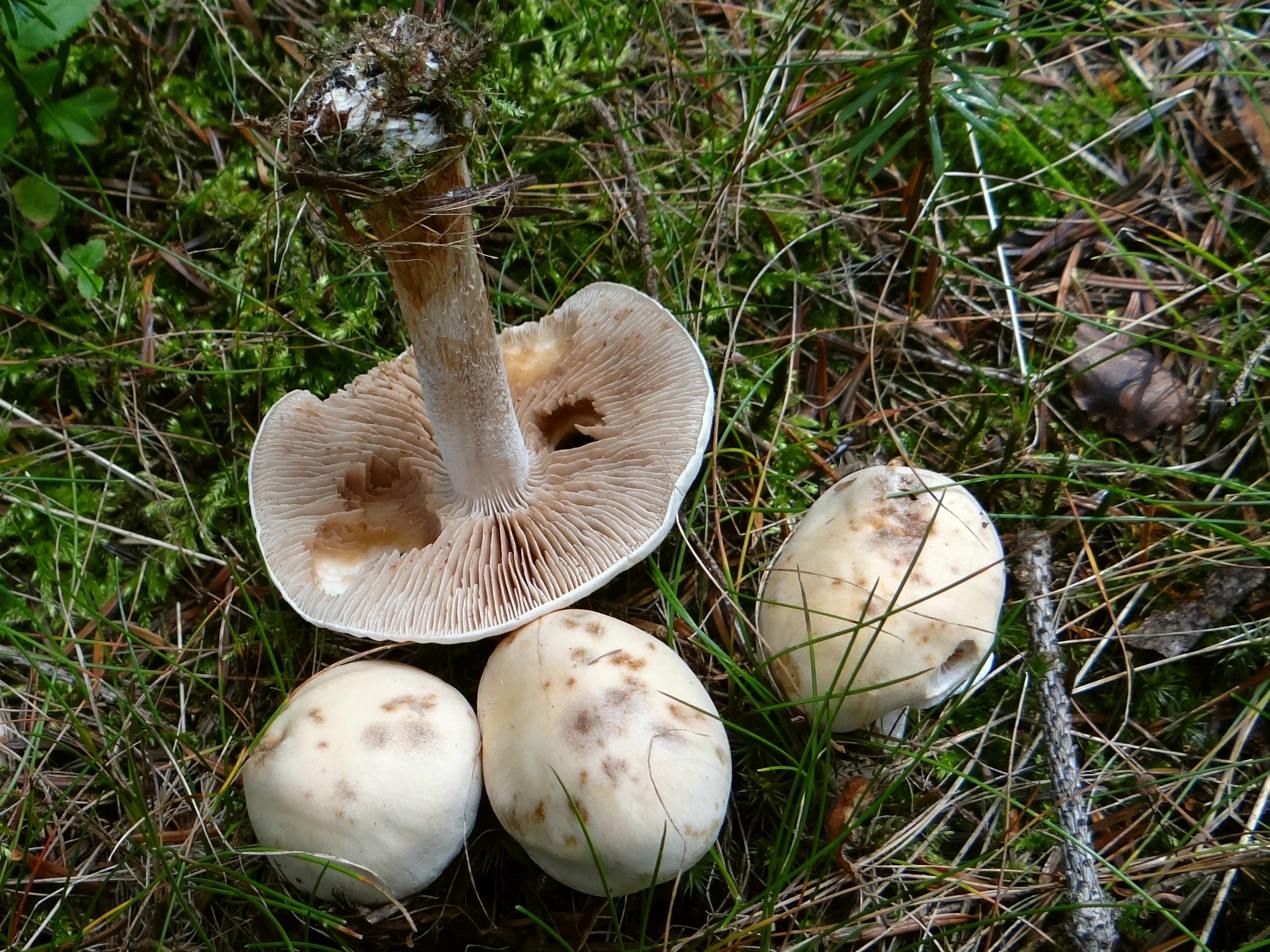

Scientific classification
- Domain: Eukaryota
- Kingdom: Fungi
- Division: Basidiomycota
- Class: Agaricomycetes
- Order: Agaricales
- Family: Hymenogastraceae
- Genus: Hebeloma
- Species: H. laterinum

Binomial name
- Hebeloma laterinum (Batsch) Vesterh. (2005)

= Hebeloma laterinum =

Species of fungus

Hebeloma laterinum is a species of mushroom in the family Hymenogastraceae.
