= List of poisonous mushroom species =

This is a compendium of poisonous mushrooms. See also mushroom poisoning.

== List of toxic mushroom species ==
There are 121 poisonous fungus species listed below.

Scientific name	Common name	Active agent	Distribution	Similar edible species	Picture
Agaricus californicus	California Agaricus	phenol and xanthodermin	North America	Edible Agaricus species	Agaricus californicus
Agaricus hondensis	Felt-ringed Agaricus	phenol and xanthodermin	North America	Edible Agaricus species	Agaricus hondensis
Agaricus menieri		phenol and xanthodermin	Europe	Edible Agaricus species	
Agaricus moelleri	Inky Mushroom	phenol and xanthodermin	Europe	Edible Agaricus species	Agaricus moelleri
Agaricus phaeolepidotus		phenol and xanthodermin	Europe	Edible Agaricus species	
Agaricus placomyces		phenol and xanthodermin	North America and Europe	Edible Agaricus species	Agaricus placomyces
Agaricus xanthodermus	Yellow-staining mushroom	phenol and xanthodermin	worldwide	Edible Agaricus species	Agaricus xanthodermus
Amanita abrupta	American abrupt-bulbed Lepidella	L-2-amino-4-pentynoic acid and 2-Amino-4,5-hexadienoic acid	North America	Edible Agaricus species	Amanita abrupta
Amanita aprica	Sunshine amanita	muscarine and ibotenic acid (maybe not muscarine but muscimol)	North America		Amanita aprica
Amanita boudieri	Boudier's lepidella	A. smithiana toxin	Europe	Edible Agaricus species Amanita vittadinii	Amanita boudieri
Amanita chlorinosma	Chlorine Lepidella		Eastern United States		Amanita chlorinosma 21519
Amanita citrina	False Death Cap	bufotenin	Europe and North America		Amanita citrina
Amanita cokeri	Coker's amanita	2-amino-3-cyclopropylbutanoic acid and 2-amino-5-chloro-4-pentenoic acid	North America	Amanita vittadinii Amanita strobiliformis Edible Agaricus species	Amanita cokeri
Amanita cothurnata	Booted amanita	muscimol and ibotenic acid	North America		Amanita cothurnata
Amanita echinocephala	European solitary amanita	A. smithiana toxin	Europe, Western Asia and North Africa	Amanita vittadinii Amanita strobiliformis Edible Agaricus species	Amanita echinocephala
Amanita farinosa	Powdery Amanita	unknown	North America		Amanita farinosa
Amanita flavorubescens		unknown	North America	Amanita rubescens Amanita novinupta Amanita jacksonii Amanita hemibapha	
Amanita gemmata	Gemmed Amanita	muscimol and ibotenic acid	Europe, North Africa, Asia and North America		Amanita gemmata
Amanita gioiosa	Pebbly Soil Amanita	unknown (probably muscimol and ibotenic acid)	Europe and North Africa		Amanita gioiosa
Amanita gracilior	European Slender Lepidella	A. smithiana toxin	Europe		
Amanita heterochroma	Eucalyptus fly agaric	unknown (probably muscimol and ibotenic acid)	Europe and North Africa	Amanita caesarea	
Amanita hongoi	Hongo's Amanita	unknown	Japan		
Amanita ibotengutake	Japanese ringed-bulbed Amanita	muscimol and ibotenic acid	Japan		
Amanita muscaria	Fly agaric	muscimol and ibotenic acid	Worldwide	Amanita caesarea Amanita jacksonii Amanita hemibapha	Amanita muscaria
Amanita neoovoidea	East Asian egg amidella	2-amino-4,5-hexadienoic acid	East Asia	Amanita ovoidea	Amanita neoovoidea
Amanita pantherina	Panther cap	muscimol and ibotenic acid	Europe, North Africa, Eastern Asia (a similar American species exist but is not published yet)	Amanita rubescens	Amanita pantherina
Amanita phalloides	Death cap		Europe	Amanita caesarea Volvariella volvacea	
Amanita porphyria	Grey veiled Amanita	unknown (probably bufotenin)	North America and Europe		Amanita porphyria
Amanita pseudoporphyria	Hongo's false death cap	2-amino-4,5-hexadienoic acid	Asia		Amanita pseudoporphyria
Amanita pseudoregalis	False royal fly agaric	unknown (probably muscimol and ibotenic acid)	Europe	Amanita rubescens	
Amanita pseudorubescens	False blusher	unknown	Europe	Amanita rubescens	
Amanita regalis	Royal fly agaric	muscimol and ibotenic acid	Europe and Alaska	Amanita rubescens	Amanita regalis
Amanita smithiana	Smith's Amanita	A. smithiana toxin and 2-amino-4,5-hexadienoic acid	North America		Amanita smithiana
Ampulloclitocybe clavipes	Club-footed clitocybe	unknown	North America and Europe	Infundibulicybe geotropa Infundibulicybe gibba	Ampulloclitocybe clavipes
Clathrus ruber					
Chlorophyllum molybdites	Green-spored parasol	unknown	worldwide (very rare in Europe)	Chlorophyllum rhacodes Chlorophyllum olivieri Coprinus comatus	Chlorophyllum molybdites
Clitocybe cerussata		muscarine	Europe	Clitopilus prunulus	
Clitocybe dealbata	Ivory Funnel	muscarine	Europe	Clitopilus prunulus Marasmius oreades	Clitocybe dealbata
Coprinopsis alopecia		coprine	Europe		
Coprinopsis atramentaria	Common ink cap	coprine	North America, Europe, Asia and Australia		Coprinopsis atramentaria
Coprinopsis romagnesiana	Scaly ink cap	coprine	Europe		Coprinopsis romagnesiana
Cortinarius bolaris		unknown	Europe		Cortinarius bolaris
Cortinarius callisteus	Tawny Webcap	unknown	Europe	Cantharellus spp.	
Cortinarius cinnabarinus		unknown	Europe	Laccaria laccata	Cortinarius cinnabarinus
Cortinarius cinnamomeofulvus		unknown	Europe	Craterellus tubaeformis Craterellus lutescens Laccaria laccata	
Cortinarius cinnamomeoluteus		unknown	Europe	Craterellus tubaeformis Craterellus lutescens Laccaria laccata	Cortinarius cinnamomeoluteus
Cortinarius cinnamomeus	Cinnamon webcap	unknown	North America and Europe	Craterellus tubaeformis Craterellus lutescens Laccaria laccata	Cortinarius cinnamomeus
Cortinarius cruentus		unknown	Europe		
Cortinarius gentilis		unknown	Europe	Cantharellus spp.	Cortinarius gentilis
Cortinarius limonius		unknown	North America and Europe	Cantharellus spp.	Cortinarius limonius
Cortinarius malicorius		unknown	Europe	Craterellus tubaeformis Craterellus lutescens Laccaria laccata	Cortinarius malicorius
Cortinarius mirandus		unknown	Europe		
Cortinarius palustris		unknown	Europe	Craterellus tubaeformis Craterellus lutescens Laccaria laccata	
Cortinarius phoeniceus		unknown	Europe		Cortinarius phoeniceus
Cortinarius rubicundulus		unknown	North America and Europe	Cantharellus spp.	Cortinarius rubicundulus
Cortinarius smithii	Smith's Cortinarius	unknown	North America		Cortinarius smithii
Cudonia circinans		gyromitrin and monomethylhydrazine	North America, Europe and Asia	Morchella spp. Cantharellus spp.	Cudonia circinans
Gyromitra perlata	Pig's ears	gyromitrin and monomethylhydrazine	North America and Europe	Disciotis venosa	Gyromitra perlata
Echinoderma asperum	Freckled dapperling	unknown	North America Europe, Asia and Oceania	Macrolepiota procera Chlorophyllum rhacodes	Echinoderma asperum
Echinoderma calcicola		unknown	Europe	Macrolepiota procera Chlorophyllum rhacodes	
Entoloma albidum		unknown	North America	Calocybe gambosa Clitopilus prunulus Clitocybe multiceps	
Entoloma rhodopolium	Wood pinkgill	unknown	Europe and Asia	Entoloma sarcopum	Entoloma rhodopolium
Entoloma sinuatum	Livid Entoloma	unknown	North America, Europe and Asia	Calocybe gambosa Clitopilus prunulus Clitocybe multiceps	Entoloma sinuatum
Galerina indica	dark magic mushroom	α-proamanitin	Asia, North America		
Galerina marginata	funeral bell, deadly skullcap, autumn skullcap, deadly galerina	α-amanitin and γ-amanitin	North America, Europe, Asia, Australia, Antarctica		
Hebeloma crustuliniforme	Poison pie	unknown	North America, Europe and Australia	Calocybe gambosa Clitopilus geminus Lepista irina	Hebeloma crustuliniforme
Hebeloma sinapizans	Rough-stalked hebeloma	unknown	North America and Europe	Calocybe gambosa Clitopilus geminus Lepista irina	Hebeloma sinapizans
Helvella crispa	Elfin saddle	unknown	Europe		Helvella crispa
Helvella dryophila	Oak-loving elfin saddle	unknown	North America	Morchella spp.	Helvella dryophila
Helvella lactea		unknown	North America and Europe		Helvella lactea
Helvella lacunosa	Slate grey saddle	unknown	worldwide	Morchella spp.	Helvella lacunosa
Helvella vespertina	Western black elfin saddle	unknown	North America	Morchella spp.	Helvella vesepertina
Hapalopilus nidulans	Tender nesting polypore	polyporic acid	worldwide (except South America)	Fistulina hepatica Laetiporus sulphureus	Hapalopilus rutilans
Hypholoma fasciculare	Sulphur tuft	fasciculol E and fasciculol F	worldwide	Hypholoma capnoides Kuehneromyces mutabilis	Hypholoma fasciculare
Hypholoma lateritium	Brick cap	fasciculol B & fasciculol C	North America, Europe and Asia	Hypholoma capnoides Kuehneromyces mutabilis	Hypholoma lateritium
Hypholoma marginatum		unknown	Europe	Hypholoma capnoides Kuehneromyces mutabilis	Hypholoma marginatum
Hypholoma radicosum		unknown	Europe	Hypholoma capnoides Kuehneromyces mutabilis	Hypholoma radicosum
Imperator rhodopurpureus		unknown	Europe	Neoboletus erythropus Suillellus queletii	Imperator rhodopurpureus
Imperator torosus	Brawny Bolete	unknown	Europe	Neoboletus erythropus Suillellus queletii	Imperator torosus
Inocybe fibrosa		muscarine	Europe	Tricholoma columbetta Calocybe gambosa Clitopilus prunulus	Inocybe fibrosa
Inocybe geophylla	Earthy inocybe	muscarine	North America and Europe	Clitopilus prunulus Laccaria amethystina	Inocybe geophylla var. geophylla
Inocybe hystrix		muscarine	North, Central America and Europe		Inocybe hystrix
Inocybe lacera	Torn fibercap	muscarine	North America and Europe		Inocybe lacera
Inocybe lilacina		muscarine	North America	Laccaria amethysteo-occidentalis	Inocybe geophylla var. lilacina
Inocybe sublilacina		muscarine	North America, Europe	Laccaria amethysteo-occidentalis Laccaria amethystina	
Inocybe rimosa	Straw-Colored Fiber Head	muscarine	Europe and Asia	Marasmius oreades	Inocybe rimosa
Inocybe sambucina		muscarine	Europe	Tricholoma columbetta Calocybe gambosa Clitopilus prunulus	
Lactarius torminosus	Woolly milkcap	velleral	North America, Europe, Asia and North Africa	Lactarius deliciosus	Lactarius torminosus
Leucocoprinus birnbaumii	Flowerpot Parasol		Eastern United States		
Mycena diosma		unknown (probably puraquinonic acid)	Europe	Laccaria amethystina	Mycena diosma
Mycena pelianthina	Blackedge Bonnet		Norway		
Mycena pura	Lilac bonnet	puraquinonic acid and psilocybin	Europe	Laccaria amethystina Laccaria laccata	Mycena pura
Mycena rosea	Rosy bonnet	unknown (probably puraquinonic acid)	Europe	Laccaria amethystina	Mycena rosea
Neonothopanus nambi		unknown	South America		
Panaeolus cinctulus	banded mottlegill	psilocybin and psilocin	North America, Europe, Africa and Australia	Marasmius oreades	Panaeolus cinctulus
Psilocybe semilanceata	Liberty cap	psilocybin, psilocin, and baeocystin	America, Europe, Asia and Oceania		Psilocybe semilanceata
Omphalotus illudens	Jack-O'lantern mushroom	illudin S, illudin M, and muscarine	North America and Europe	Cantharellus spp.	Omphalotus illudens
Omphalotus japonicus	Tsukiyotake	illudin S and illudin M	Asia	Pleurotus ostreatus Lentinula edodes Sarcomyxa serotina	Omphalotus japonicus
Omphalotus nidiformis	Ghost fungus	illudin S, illudin M, and illudosin	Oceania and India	Pleurotus ostreatus Lentinula edodes Sarcomyxa serotina	Omphalotus nidiformis
Omphalotus olearius	Jack-O'lantern mushroom	illudin S	Europe	Cantharellus spp.	Omphalorus olearius
Omphalotus olivascens	Western jack-o'-lantern mushroom	illudin S	America	Cantharellus spp.	Omphalotus olivascens
Paralepistopsis acromelalga		acromelic acid	Japan	Paralepista flaccida Paralepista gilva	
Paralepistopsis amoenolens	Paralysis funnel	acromelic acid	North Africa and Europe	Paralepista flaccida Paralepista inversa Infundibulicybe gibba	
Pholiotina rugosa		amatoxins	North America, Europe and Asia		Pholiotina rugosa
Ramaria formosa	Beautiful clavaria	unknown	North America, Europe and Asia	Ramaria botrytis	Ramaria formosa
Ramaria neoformosa		unknown	Europe	Ramaria botrytis	Ramaria neoformosa
Ramaria pallida		unknown	North America and Europe	Ramaria botrytis	Ramaria pallida
Rubroboletus legaliae	Le Gal's bolete	unknown (probably boletasine and muscarine)	Europe	Neoboletus erythropus Suillellus queletii	Rubroboletus legaliae
Rubroboletus lupinus	Wolves bolete	unknown (probably boletasine and muscarine)	Europe	Neoboletus erythropus Suillellus queletii	Rubroboletus lupinus
Rubroboletus pulcherrimus		unknown	North America	Neoboletus erythropus Suillellus queletii	Rubroboletus pulcherrimus
Rubroboletus satanas	Satan's bolete	boletasine and muscarine	Europe	Neoboletus erythropus Suillellus queletii	Rubroboletus satanas
Russula emetica	The sickener	lactarorufin A, methoxyfuranalcohol, and R. emetica unnamed compound	North America, Europe, North Africa and Asia	Russula aurea Russula cyanoxantha	Russula emetica
Russula subnigricans		unknown			
Sarcosphaera coronaria	Pink crown		North America, Europe, North Africa and Asia		Sarcosphaera coronaria
Scleroderma citrinum	Common earthball	unknown	North America, Europe and Asia	Apioperdon pyriforme	Scleroderma citrinum
Tricholoma equestre	Yellow knight	unknown	Europe		Tricholoma equestre
Tricholoma pardinum	Tiger tricholoma	unknown	North America, Europe and Asia	Tricholoma terreum Tricholoma myomyces	Tricholoma pardinum
Tricholoma muscarium		tricholomic acid and ibotenic acid	Japan		
Trogia venenata	Little white mushroom	unknown	China		
Turbinellus floccosus	Woolly false chanterelle	norcaperatic acid	North America and Eastern Asia	Gomphus clavatus Polyozellus multiplex Cantharellus spp.	Turbinellus floccosus
Turbinellus kauffmanii		norcaperatic acid	North America	Gomphus clavatus Polyozellus multiplex Cantharellus spp.	Turbinellus kauffmanii

== List of suspicious mushroom species ==
Scientific name	Common name	Distribution	Picture
Agrocybe arenicola		Europe	
Amanita albocreata	Ringless panther	North America	Amanita albocreata
Amanita altipes	Yellow long-stem Amanita	China	
Amanita breckonii		North America	Amanita breckonii
Amanita ceciliae	Snakeskin grisette	North America and Europe	Amanita ceciliae
Amanita eliae	Fries's Amanita	Europe and North Africa	Amanita eliae
Amanita flavoconia	Yellow-dust Amanita	North America	Amanita flavoconia
Amanita frostiana	Frost's Amanita	North America	
Amanita nehuta	Mahori dust Amanita	New Zealand	Amanita nehuta
Amanita parcivolvata	Ringless False Fly Amanita	America	Amanita parcivolvata
Amanita parvipantherina	Asian Small Panther Amanita	China	
Amanita petalinivolva		South America	
Amanita roseotincta		North America	Amanita roseotincta
Amanita rubrovolvata	Red volva Amanita	Asia	Amanita rubrovolvata
Amanita subfrostiana	False Frost's Amanita	China	
Amanita velatipes	Veiled-Bulb Amanita	North America	Amanita velatipes
Amanita viscidolutea		South America	
Amanita wellsii	Wells's Amanita	North America	Amanita wellsii
Amanita xanthocephala	Vermilion grisette	Australia	Amanita xanthocephala
Armillaria mellea	Honey fungus	North America, Europe, Northern Asia and Australia	Armillaria mellea
Calocera viscosa	Yellow stagshorn	North America, Europe and Asia	Calocera viscosa
Chlorophyllum brunneum	Shaggy parasol	North America, Europe, Australia and Southern Africa	Chlorophyllum brunneum
Choiromyces venosus		Europe	
Clitocybe fragrans		Europe	Clitocybe fragrans
Clitocybe nebularis	Clouded agaric	North America and Europe	Clitocybe nebularis
Conocybe subovalis		Europe	Conocybe subovalis
Coprinellus micaceus	Mica cap	worldwide	Coprinellus micaceus
Lactarius chrysorrheus	Yellowdrop milkcap	North America, Europe and North Africa	Lactarius chrysorrheus
Lactarius helvus	Fenugreek milkcap	Europe and Asia	Lactarius helvus
Lepiota cristata	Stinking dapperling	North America, Europe, Northern Africa, Northern Asia and New Zealand	Lepiota cristata
Marasmius collinus		Europe	
Russula olivacea		North America, Europe and Asia	Russula olivacea
Russula viscida		Europe	
Schizophyllum commune		worldwide	Schizophyllum commune
Stropharia aeruginosa	Verdigris agaric	North America and Europe	Stropharia aeruginosa
Suillus granulatus	Weeping bolete	worldwide	
Tricholoma sulphureum	Gas agaric	Europe and North America	Tricholoma sulphureum

== See also ==
- List of deadly mushroom species
- List of poisonous animals
- List of poisonous plants
- Mushroom poisoning
- Mycotoxicology
- Mycotoxin
