= Yellowfoot =

Yellowfoot or yellow foot may refer to:

- Craterellus tubaeformis a mushroom with gray underside
- Craterellus lutescens, a mushroom with orange, pink, or white underside, usually found in wetlands
- Harrya chromapes, a mushroom that is white to pinkish with a bright yellow base
