= Lutescens =

Lutescens or lutescans (Latin for "marshy, living in the marshes", from lutum "marsh, swamp, mud") may refer to:

- Caiman lutescens, a fossil species of caiman.
- Dypsis lutescens, a palm
- Pitcairnia lutescens, a species of bromeliads
- Craterellus lutescens, a mushroom
- Helix lutescens, a snail
- Aloeides lutescens, a butterfly
- Thalassoma lutescens, a fish
- Ellobius lutescens, a rodent
- Lutescens, a variety of wheat cultivated in Eastern Europe, see Taxonomy of wheat
- Tremella lutescens, a formerly recognized species of fungus, see Tremella mesenterica
- anglicized "lutescan" used once of the Mysian language (Titchener, J.B. 1926, "Synopsis of Greek and Roman Civilization", Cambridge MA)
