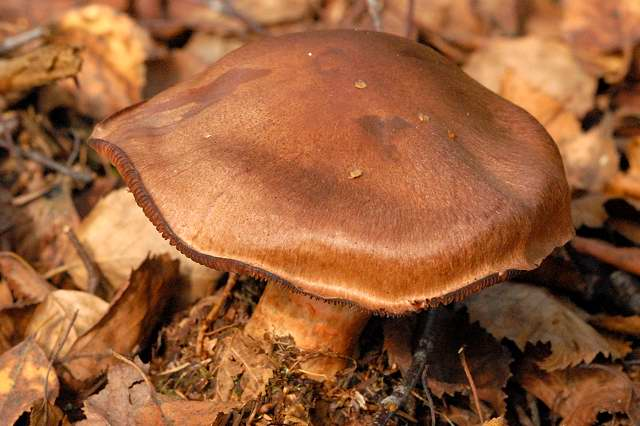

Scientific classification
- Kingdom: Fungi
- Division: Basidiomycota
- Class: Agaricomycetes
- Order: Agaricales
- Family: Cortinariaceae
- Genus: Cortinarius
- Species: C. cinnamomeus

Binomial name
- Cortinarius cinnamomeus (L.) Fr. (1838)

Synonyms
- Agaricus cinnamomeus L. (1753); Dermocybe cinnamomea (L.) M.M.Moser; Flammula cinnamomea (L.) P.Kumm.; Gomphos cinnamomeus (L.) Kuntze

= Cortinarius cinnamomeus =

Species of fungus

Cortinarius cinnamomeus Mycological characteristics
- Gills on hymenium
- Cap is convex
- Hymenium is emarginate
- Stipe is bare
- Ecology is mycorrhizal
- Edibility is not recommended

Cortinarius cinnamomeus, also known as the cinnamon webcap, is a basidiomycete mushroom of the genus Cortinarius. The fungus produces brown fruit bodies with caps up to 6 cm (2.4 in) wide and stems up to 12 cm (4.7 in) long. The closely crowded gills underside the cap are initially yellow before turning brown.

The species is common in damp places in coniferous forests. It is distributed throughout the temperate zone of the Northern Hemisphere.

== Taxonomy ==
First described by Carl Linnaeus in 1753 as Agaricus cinnamomeus, the fungus was given its current name by Elias Magnus Fries in 1838. The names Dermocybe cinnamomea (Moser), Flammula cinnamomea (Kummer, 1871) and Gomphos cinnamomeus (Kuntze, 1898) reflect differing approaches over the years to the taxonomy of Cortinarius species. The mushroom is commonly known as the "cinnamon webcap".

== Description ==
The cap is quite thinly fleshy, 3–6 centimetres (1 1/4–2 1/4 in) in diameter, initially quite spherical, later bluntly convex to bell-shaped, usually with an umbo, and often irregular and bent or wavy towards the margin. The margin is initially curved inward, then straight, sometimes at the margin itself slightly flexuosely rugose or even briefly fimbriate. The cap surface is dry and opaque, fibrillosely squamulose, tomentose, at first vivid yellow ochre to yellow or copper olivaceous, later glabrescent or quite glabrous and when mature brownish olive or light olive, often with a saffron tint at the margin, and with numerous fibrils from the universal veil when young; later the margin is mostly concolorous.

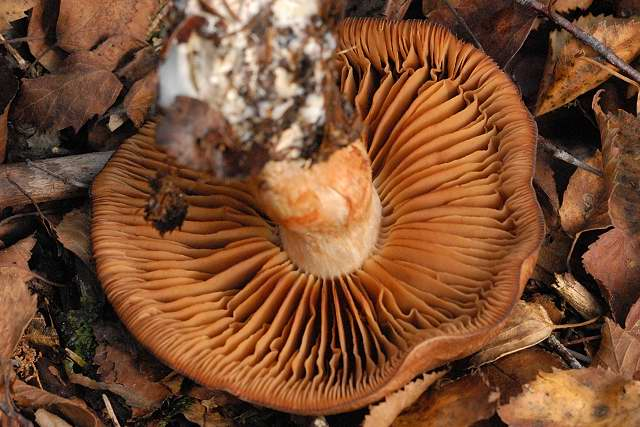
The gills are crowded and have an emarginate attachment to the stem.

The gills are crowded closely together, 3–5 millimetres (1/8–1/4 in) broad, emarginate (notched), adnate by a tooth. The color is vivid yellow when young, then brownish-olive, rarely with saffron tint, and finally brownish-olive to rusty cinnamon, with denticulate (finely toothed) edge, which is either the same color as the gill or paler. Young specimens have a yellow cortina of fine fibers that extend from the cap to the stem. The stem is 8–12 cm (3 1/4–4 3/4 in) tall and 0.5–1 cm (1/4–1/2 in) wide, cylindrical, often slightly wavy, solid, then hollow, fibrillose and quite fragile. At first it is almost the same color as the gills, vivid yellow or yellow later with a more or less olive tone, and in some places turning brown. It is covered with fibrils from the veil, which forms one or two incomplete, oblique, and usually fugacious zones. The flesh is thin, in the cap pale yellow or yellow with olive tones, a little darker in the stem, yellow to olive, with a faint slightly radishy smell and mild taste.

The basidia (spore-bearing cells) are 20–30 by 5–8 μm. The spores are elliptical with a slightly roughened surface, measuring 6–9.5 by 4–5 μm and producing a rusty-brown spore print.

=== Similar species ===
It resembles C. croceus, C. gentilis, other members of the subgenus Dermocybe, as well as some in Telamonia.

== Distribution and habitat ==
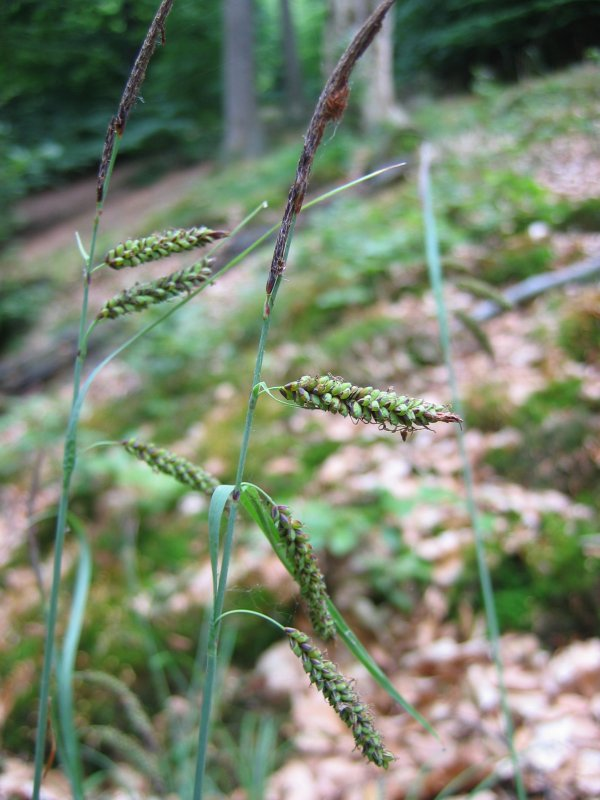
The fungus forms ectomycorrhiza-like structures with the sedge Carex flacca.

The fruit bodies of are common in damp places in coniferous forests, growing not only in Europe but apparently throughout the temperate zone of the Northern Hemisphere. It has also been collected from Yunnan Province, China.

The species colonizes the root systems of the sedges Carex flacca and Carex pilulifera, forming ectomycorrhizal-like structures lacking a Hartig net—a network of hyphae that penetrate between the epidermal and cortical cells of the root. The structures formed between C. cinnamomeus and the sedges possess a distinct fungal mantle (85–100 μm thick), hyphal infection in epidermal cells, rhizomorphs and extramatrical hyphae. These ectomycorrhiza-like structures are formed on first-order lateral roots but are morphologically and anatomically distinct from dauciform roots (short swollen hairy lateral roots).

== Uses ==
The fruit bodies are used in mushroom dyeing to produce a brown color.

Although it has been claimed to be edible, it can resemble some deadly poisonous species.

== See also ==
- List of Cortinarius species
