= Fairy cake =

Fairy cakes may refer to:

- A British cupcake, typically of a smaller size than the American variety
- Hebeloma crustuliniforme, a poisonous mushroom
