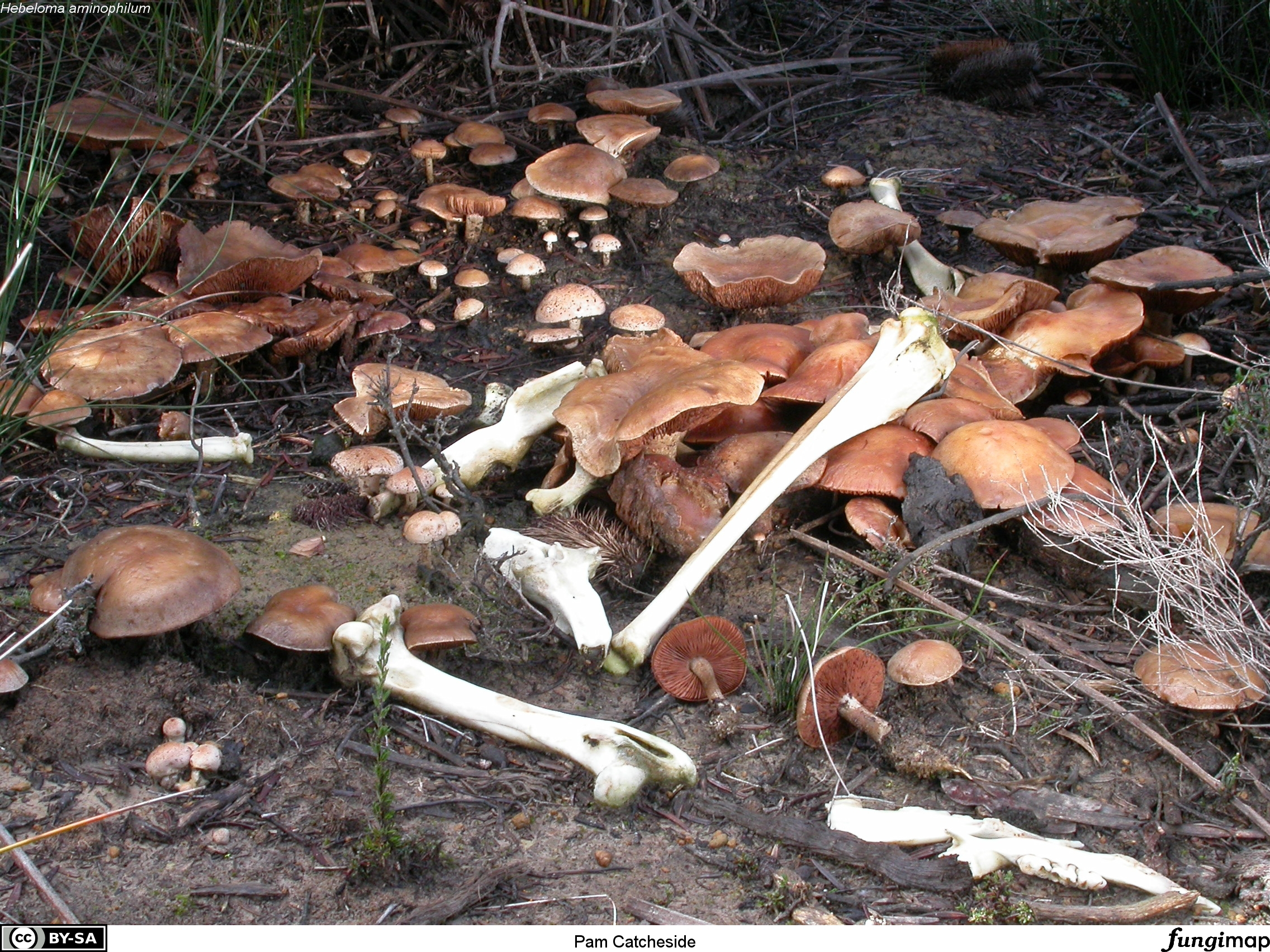

Scientific classification
- Kingdom: Fungi
- Division: Basidiomycota
- Class: Agaricomycetes
- Order: Agaricales
- Family: Hymenogastraceae
- Genus: Hebeloma
- Species: H. aminophilum

Binomial name
- Hebeloma aminophilum R.N.Hilton & O.K. Mill. (1987)

= Hebeloma aminophilum =

Species of fungus

Hebeloma aminophilum
- Mycological characteristics
- Gills on hymenium
- Cap is convex or depressed
- Hymenium is adnate or adnexed
- Stipe is bare
- Spore print is pink to brown
- Ecology is saprotrophic

Hebeloma aminophilum, commonly known as the ghoul fungus, is a species of mushroom in the family Hymenogastraceae. Found in Western Australia, it gets its common name from the propensity of the fruiting bodies to spring out of decomposing animal remains.

== Taxonomy ==
The ghoul fungus was first described by mycologists R.N. Hilton and Orson K. Miller, Jr. in 1987. The holotype collection consisted of about 100 specimens that were fruiting around the bones of a decomposing kangaroo carcass that had been dumped some months before.

=== Etymology ===
The generic name is derived from the Ancient Greek Hebe, "youth", and -loma, a fringe (pertaining to the fungal veil), referring to how the fungal veil is only seen in immature specimens. It gets its common name of ghoul fungus from its habit of growing around animal carcasses.

== Description ==
The dull pinkish brown or cream cap is 3–11 centimetres (1–4 1/2 inches) in diameter, convex initially before flattening out with age. There is a slight umbo, and the cap margin is inrolled when young. A thin white veil rapidly disappears in young mushrooms. The cap surface is sticky initially. The adnate (or sometimes adnexed) gills are pale pink to pinkish brown and up to 1 cm deep. With age, they can be encrusted with clumps of spores. The cylindrical stipe is 6.5–9 cm (2 1/2–3 1/2 in) high, 1–1.2 cm in diameter and has a thickened base and lacks a ring. The thick flesh is cream or pale yellow, with a bitter taste and a stale smell. The spore print is pinkish brown, and the oval spores measure 8.5 by 4.9 μm. The mycelium is white.

=== Similar species ===
Similar species include the introduced poisonpie (Hebeloma crustuliniforme), which has been recorded in pine plantations, the native western Australian poisonpie (H. westraliense), which does not grow near carcasses, and the Australian white webcap (Cortinarius austroalbidus), which is paler and smells of curry.

== Distribution and habitat ==
An uncommon fungus, H. aminophilum is found in southern Western Australia, southeastern South Australia and Victoria. Fruiting bodies arise in eucalyptus woodland in the vicinity of sheep, reptile and bird carcasses. The habit of growing from flesh gives it the term sarcophilous.
