= Hebeloma fusipes =

Scientific classification
- Kingdom: Fungi
- Division: Basidiomycota
- Class: Agaricomycetes
- Order: Agaricales
- Family: Hymenogastraceae
- Genus: Hebeloma
- Species: H. fusipes

Binomial name
- Hebeloma fusipes Bres.

Synonyms
- Hebelomatis fusipes (Bres.) Locq., 1979

Species of fungus

Hebeloma fusipes is a species of mushroom in the family Hymenogastraceae.
