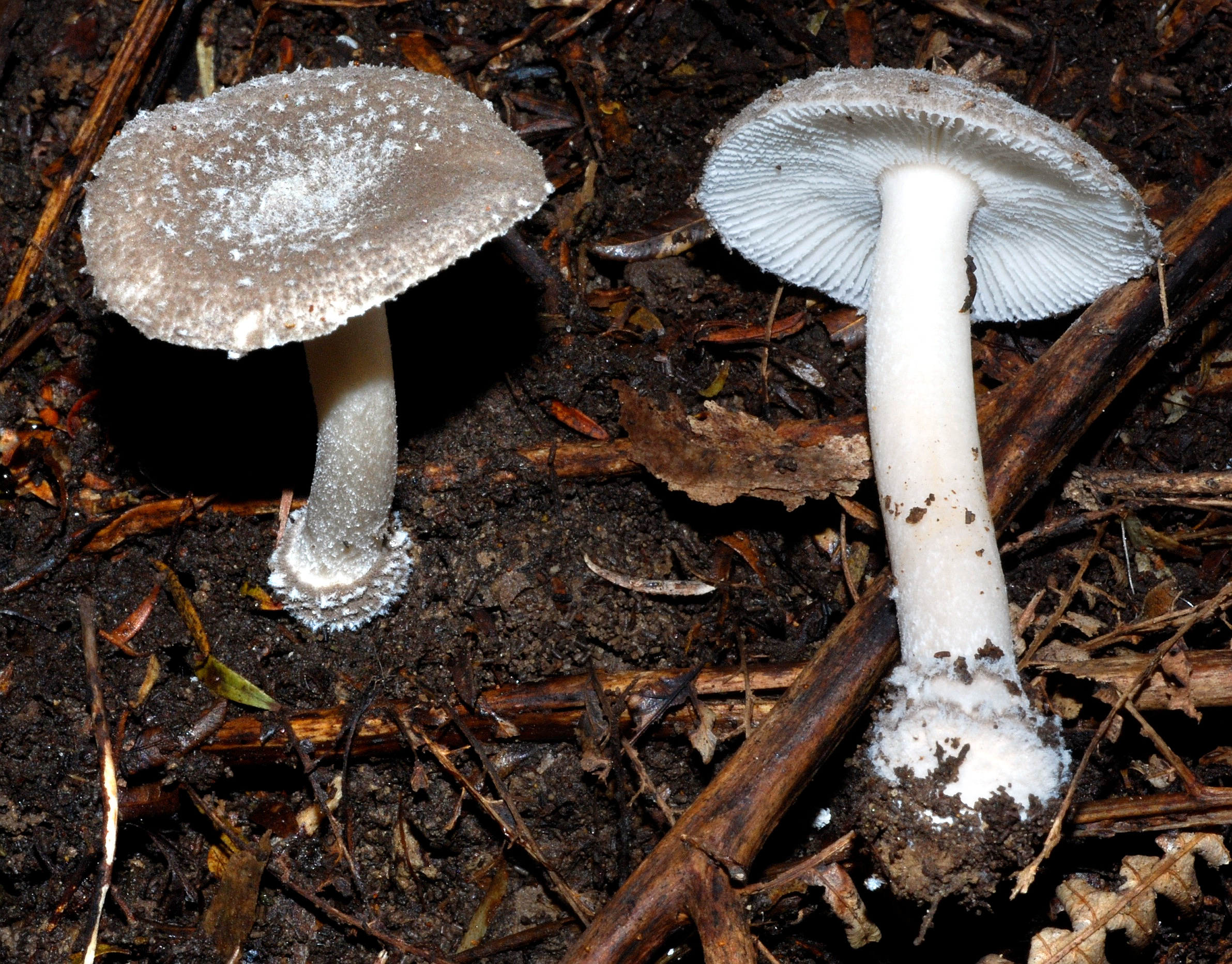
- From Auckland, New Zealand

Scientific classification
- Kingdom: Fungi
- Division: Basidiomycota
- Class: Agaricomycetes
- Order: Agaricales
- Family: Amanitaceae
- Genus: Amanita
- Species: A. nehuta

Binomial name
- Amanita nehuta G.S.Ridl. (1991)

= Amanita nehuta =

Species of fungus

Amanita nehuta
- Mycological characteristics
- Gills on hymenium
- Cap is flat or convex
- Hymenium is free
- Stipe has a volva
- Spore print is white
- Ecology is mycorrhizal
- Edibility is unknown

Amanita nehuta, also called Maori dust amanita, is a species of fungus in the family Amanitaceae. It has only a dark ring rather than a universal veil and white spores. Abundant in New Zealand, it can be found growing under Leptospermum and Nothofagus species.

== Taxonomy ==
The species was first described by New Zealand mycologist Geoff Ridley in 1991.

== Description ==
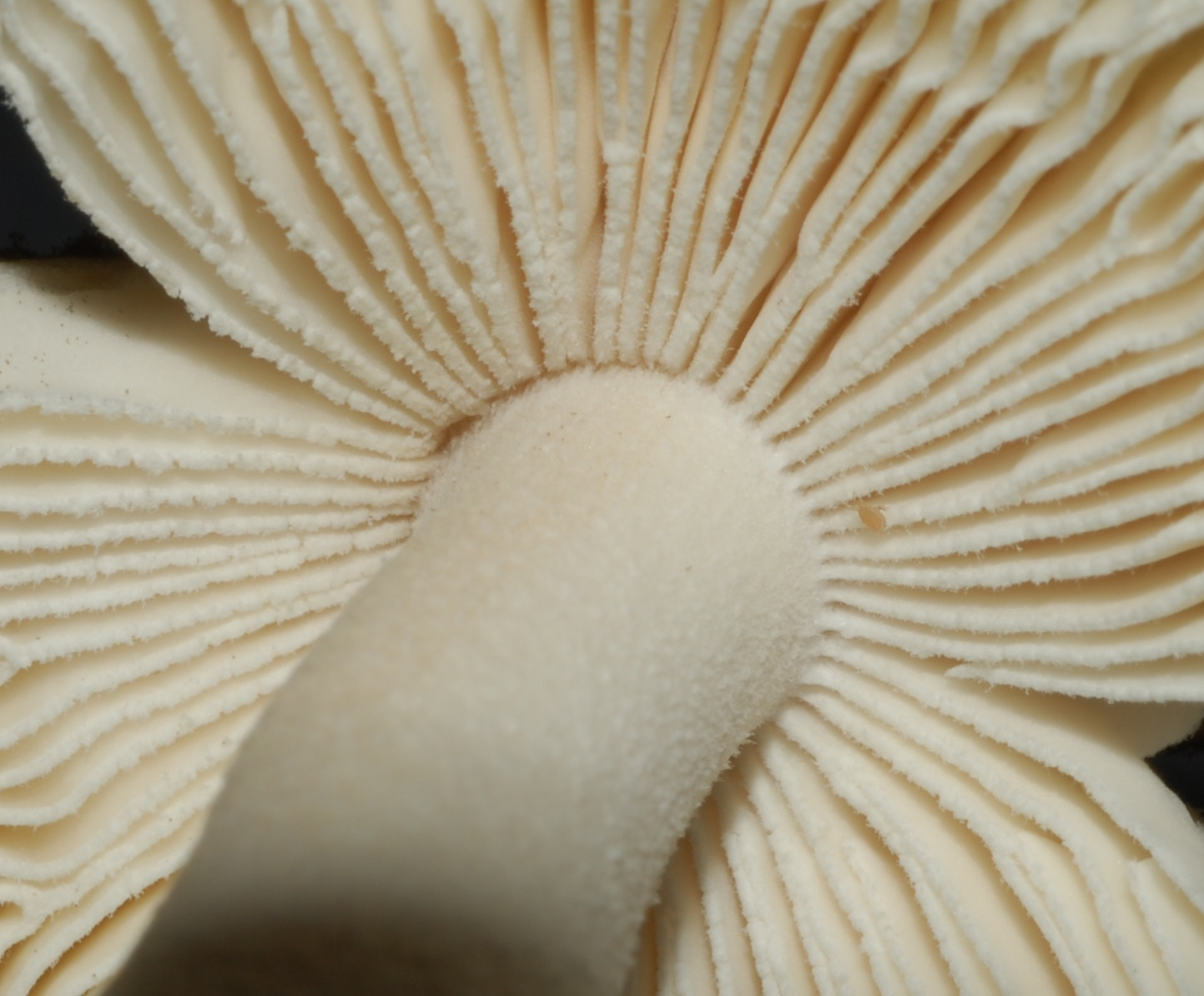
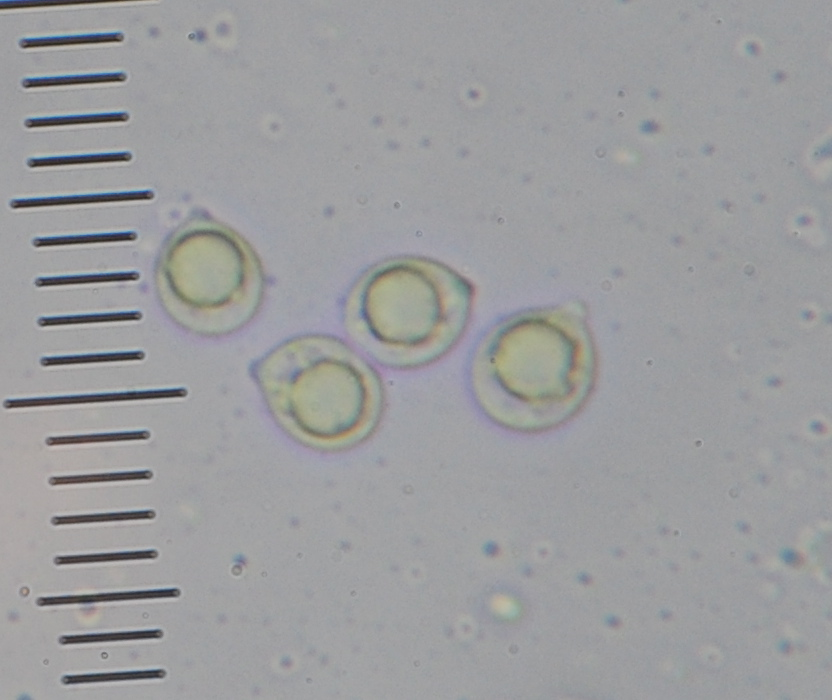
Closer view of the gills (left) and spores (right) of Amanita nehuta

Growing on the ground usually in late summer, the cap is 2.5–6.5 centimetres (1–2 1/2 inches) wide, plano-convex to plano-depressed, buff, non-viscid, with a striate margin. The volval remnants are pulverulent on the center raised into wart-like peaksor warts or radial ridges, colored pale sepia. Gills are crowded and free, measure 6–7 millimetres (1/4–9/32 in) wide, and appear white to pale buff. The short gills are subtruncate. Its stipe is 20–75 × 4–11 mm, hollow, exannulate, with a smooth to subfloccose upper stem and smooth lower stem. The surface is white, pale buff, or very pale grayish sepia in color like the cap. The basal bulb is clavate to bulbous, 10–16 mm in diameter. The base has a rim or band of powdery volva, the same color as on the cap. The stem has no ring.

The spores measure 6.5–9 × 5.5–8 (-8.5) μm and are subglobose to broadly ellipsoid to ellipsoid and inamyloid. They are white in color. Clamps are absent at the bases of the basidia. The flesh is white, with a very pale area under the skin in the center.

=== Similar species ===
Amanita nehuta is said to be similar to A. farinosa, A. obsita, A. subvaginata and A. xerocybe. All these species appear to have a cap surface that gelatinizes late in development so that the volva remains intimately connected to the cap skin well into maturity of the fruiting body. For this reason, the cap often remains powdery looking well into maturity.

== Distribution and habitat ==
This species was originally described from Wellington, New Zealand, associated with many types of Nothofagus, Leptospermum, and Kunzea. It is also known from the South Island of New Zealand.

== See also ==
- List of Amanita species
