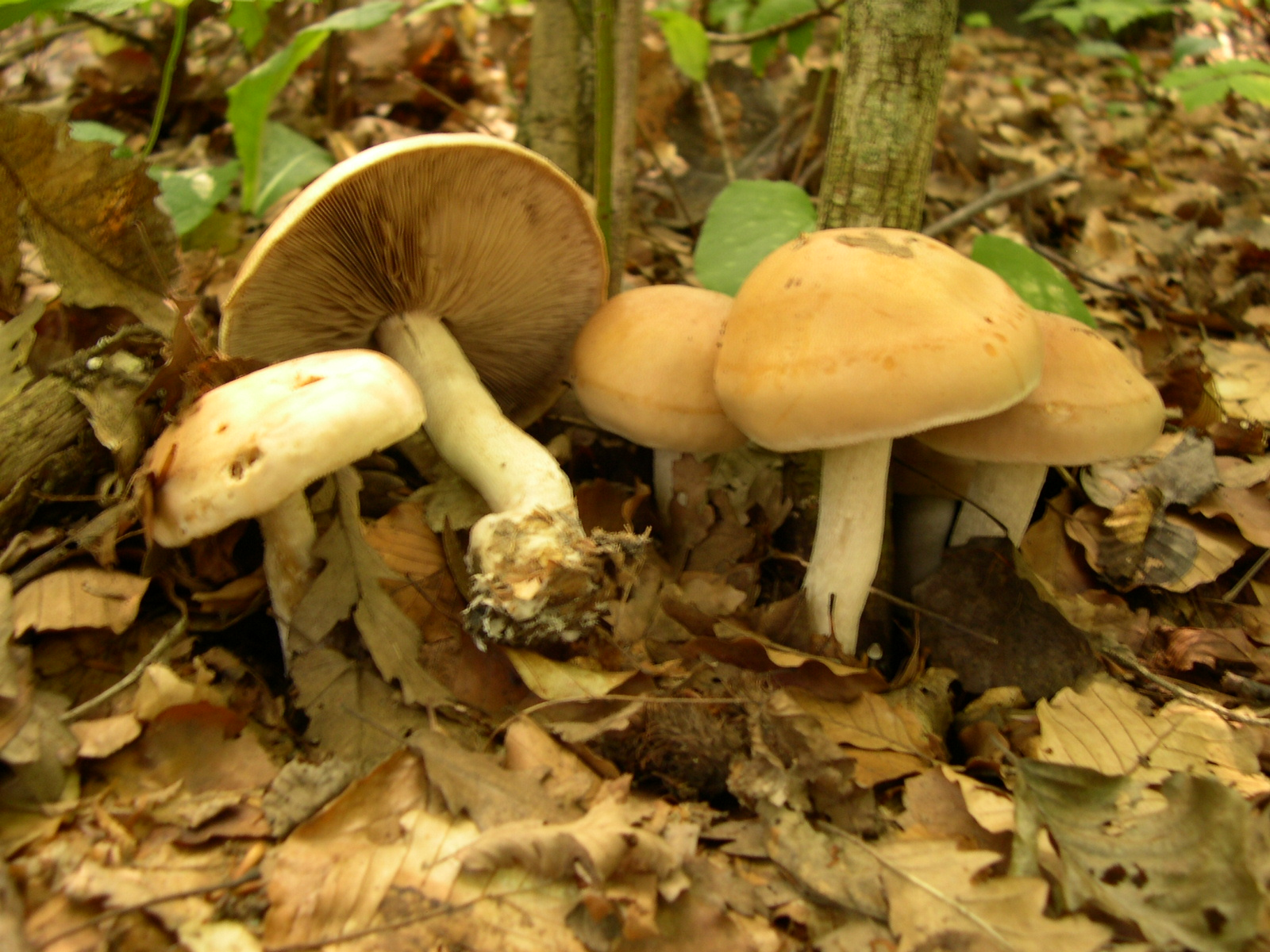

Scientific classification
- Kingdom: Fungi
- Division: Basidiomycota
- Class: Agaricomycetes
- Order: Agaricales
- Family: Hymenogastraceae
- Genus: Hebeloma
- Species: H. sinapizans

Binomial name
- Hebeloma sinapizans (Paulet) Gillet (1878)

Synonyms
- Hypophyllum sinapizans Paulet (1793); Agaricus sinapizans (Paulet) Fr. (1838); Hebeloma sinapizans (Paulet) Sacc. (1887)

= Hebeloma sinapizans =

Species of fungus

Hebeloma sinapizans
- Mycological characteristics
- Gills on hymenium
- Cap is convex
- Hymenium is adnexed
- Stipe is bare
- Spore print is brown
- Ecology is mycorrhizal
- Edibility is poisonous

Hebeloma sinapizans, commonly known as the scaly-stalked heboloma, rough-stalked hebeloma or the bitter poisonpie, is a species of mushroom in the family Hymenogastraceae. It has a strong radish-like smell and a prominent bulbous stem base. H. sinapizans is found in Europe and North America and is poisonous.

== Taxonomy ==
First described as Hypophyllum sinapizans by Jean-Jacques Paulet in 1793, it was transferred to the genus Hebeloma by Claude Casimir Gillet in 1878. It is commonly known as the "rough-stalked Hebeloma".

== Description ==
The fruit body has a cap that is initially convex before flattening out in age, reaching a diameter of 4–16 centimetres (1 1/2–6 1/2 inches). The cap may have a shallow umbo. The cap surface is smooth, moist to sticky, and first with an inrolled margin then becoming uplifted. It is tannish, sometimes with pinkish grayish tints. The gills have an adnate attachment to the stipe and have a notch just before the point of attachment; the gill edges have tiny fringes or serrations. They are first whitish before turning pale brown in maturity. The spore print is pale brown.

The stipe measures 2–13 cm (1–5 in) long and 1–3 cm (1–3 cm) thick; it is roughly equal in width except for a swollen base. The flesh is whitish, thick, and has a radish-like odor and taste. The spores are elliptical with a rough surface texture and measure 10–14 by 6–8 μm.

=== Similar species ===
It is similar to the more common H. crustuliniforme, a smaller relative that is also poisonous.

== Distribution and habitat ==
As of December 2022, the species has been found in 20 countries across Europe as well as in Asiatic Turkey and Lebanon.

The fungus fruits on the ground in groups or fairy rings in deciduous and coniferous forests.

== Toxicity ==
H. sinapizans mushrooms are poisonous, causing gastrointestinal upset.

== See also ==
- List of Hebeloma species
