= Aureonarius controversus =

Scientific classification
- Domain: Eukaryota
- Kingdom: Fungi
- Division: Basidiomycota
- Class: Agaricomycetes
- Order: Agaricales
- Family: Cortinariaceae
- Genus: Aureonarius
- Species: A. controversus

Binomial name
- Aureonarius controversus (Gasparini) Niskanen & Liimat. (2022)

Synonyms
- Cortinarius controversus Gasparini (2008)

Species of fungus

Aureonarius controversus is a species of fungus in the family Cortinariaceae.

== Taxonomy ==
It was first described in 2008 by the mycologist Bruno Gasparini who classified it as Cortinarius controversus.

In 2022 the species was transferred from Cortinarius and reclassified as Aureonarius controversus based on genomic data.

== Habitat and distribution ==
It is native to Tasmania.
