= Mushroom dye =

Color extracts from fungi

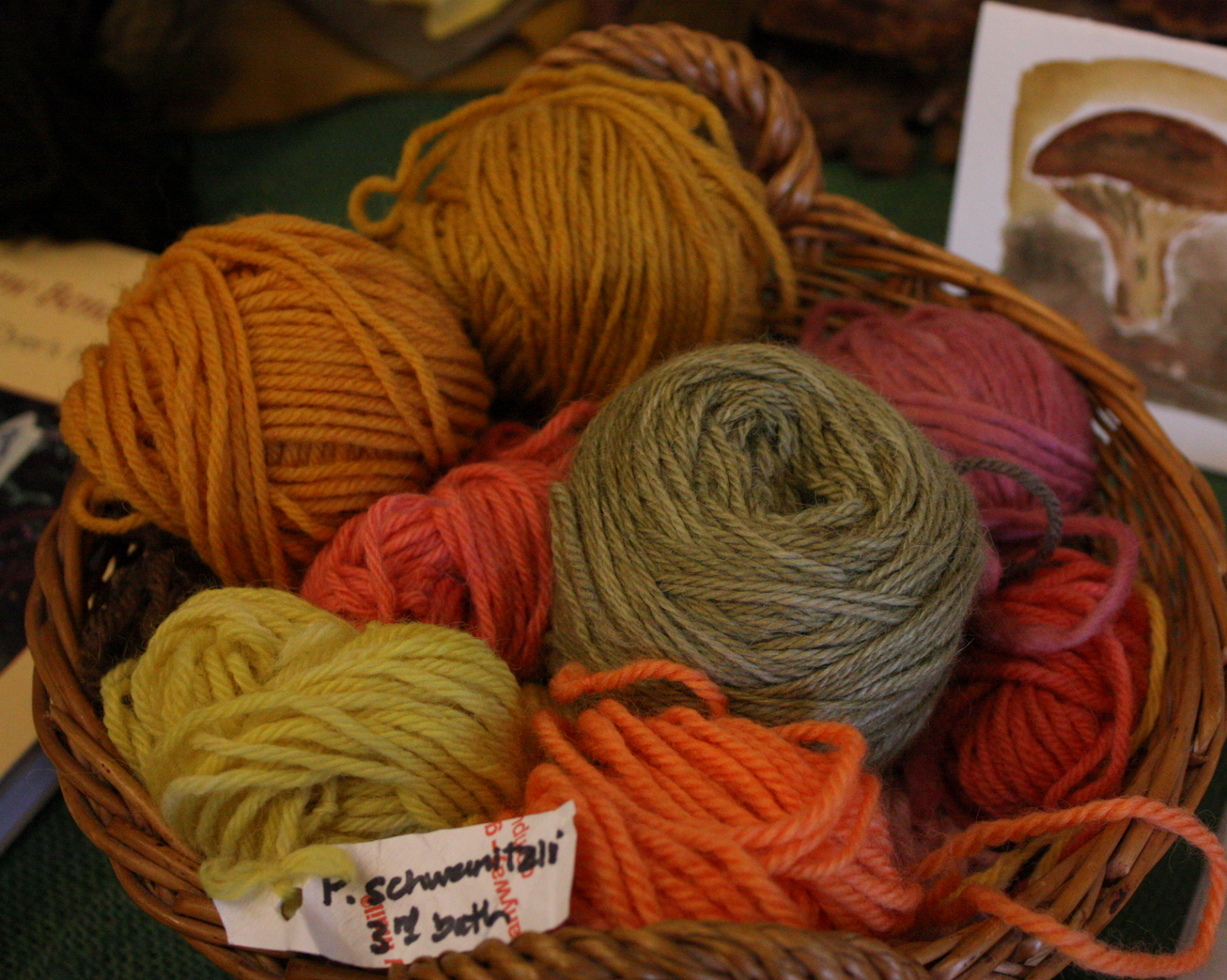
Yarn colored using mushroom dye

Mushrooms can be used to create color dyes via color-extraction with a solvent (often ammonia) as well as particulation of raw material. The shingled hedgehog mushroom and related species contain blue-green pigments, which are used for dyeing wool in Norway. The fruiting body of Hydnellum peckii can be used to produce a beige color when no mordant is used, and shades of blue or green depending on the mordant added. Phaeolus schweinitzii produces green, yellow, gold, or brown colors, depending on the material dyed and the mordant used.

Mushroom	Color catalyst	Color created
Chanterelle	ammonia	dull yellow
Artist's conk	ammonia	rust
Horse mushroom	salt water	yellowish green
Meadow mushroom	salt water	yellowish green
Turkey tail	ammonia	variable
False turkey tail	ammonia	variable
Shaggy mane	iron pot/ammonia	greyish-green
King bolete	ammonia	reddish-yellow
Oyster mushroom	iron pot/ammonia	greyish-green
Lobster mushroom	ammonia	cinnamon pink to red
Dyer's polypore	ammonia copper pot/ammonia iron pot/ammonia salt water	orange deep green rust red yellow (fluorescent under UV)
Maitake	ammonia	light yellow
Chicken of the woods	ammonia	orange
Giant puffball	ammonia	dark red
Lingzhi	ammonia	rust
Blewit	ammonia	green
Jumbo gym	pH 4	butter yellow
Western red dyer	pH 7	red, orange, pink, purple
Western jack o'lantern		purple or green
Dyer's puffball		brown to orange

== See also ==
- Aspergillus oryzae, Saccharomyces cerevisiae, Saccharomyces boulardii
- Mycelium
- Mycofiltration
- Mycorrhiza - Arbuscular, Ecto, Ericoid
- Natural dye
