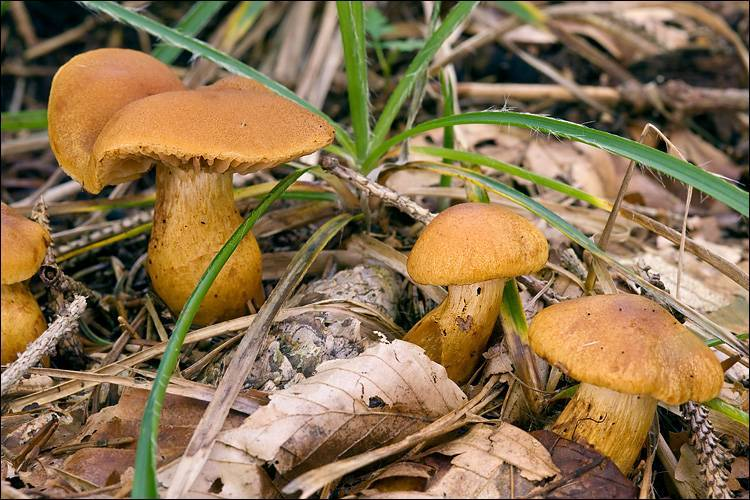
- Aureonarius callisteus

Scientific classification
- Kingdom: Fungi
- Division: Basidiomycota
- Class: Agaricomycetes
- Order: Agaricales
- Family: Cortinariaceae
- Genus: Aureonarius; Niskanen & Liimat. (2022)

Type species
- Aureonarius kroegeri (Niskanen, Liimat., E.Harrower, Berbee, Garnica & Ammirati) Niskanen & Liimat. (2021)

= Aureonarius =

Genus of fungi

Aureonarius is a genus of fungi in the family Cortinariaceae.

== Taxonomy ==
The genus was created in 2022 when the family Cortinariaceae, which previously contained only the one genus of Cortinarius was reclassified based on genomic data and split into the genera of Cortinarius, Aureonarius, Austrocortinarius, Calonarius, Cystinarius, Hygronarius, Mystinarius, Phlegmacium, Thaxterogaster and Volvanarius.

The genus is further divided with subgenus and section classifications:

- Aureonarius subgenus Aureonarius includes the section: Aureonarius.
- Aureonarius subgenus Callistei includes the sections: Callistei and Collybiani.

== Etymology ==
The name Aureonarius derives from the Latin word 'aureus' meaning golden and the suffix of the previous genus name Cortinarius. The name refers to the golden colour of the mushrooms in this genus.

== Species ==
As of January 2023, Species Fungorum accepted 18 species of Aureonarius.

1. Aureonarius armiae (Soop) Niskanen & Liimat. (2022)
2. Aureonarius aurantiobrunneus (Ammirati, Halling & Garnica) Niskanen & Liimat. (2022)
3. Aureonarius austrolimonius (M.M. Moser & E. Horak) Liimat. & Niskanen (2022)
4. Aureonarius callisteus (Fr.) Niskanen & Liimat. (2022)
5. Aureonarius caryotis (Soop) Niskanen & Liimat. (2022)
6. Aureonarius caryotoides (Soop) Niskanen & Liimat. (2022)
7. Aureonarius collybianus (Soop) Niskanen & Liimat. (2022)
8. Aureonarius controversus (Gasparini) Niskanen & Liimat. (2022)
9. Aureonarius eucollybianus (Soop) Niskanen & Liimat. (2022)
10. Aureonarius infucatus (Fr.) Niskanen & Liimat. (2022)
11. Aureonarius kroegeri (Niskanen, Liimat., E. Harrower, Berbee, Garnica & Ammirati) Niskanen & Liimat. (2022)
12. Aureonarius limonius (Fr.) Niskanen & Liimat. (2022)
13. Aureonarius neocallisteus (Kranab., Ammirati, Liimat. & Niskanen) Niskanen & Liimat. (2022)
14. Aureonarius rubrimarginatus (Soop) Niskanen & Liimat. (2022)
15. Aureonarius rubrocastaneus (Soop) Niskanen & Liimat. (2022)
16. Aureonarius rubrodactylus (Soop) Niskanen & Liimat. (2022)
17. Aureonarius tofaceus (Fr.) Niskanen & Liimat. (2022)
18. Aureonarius viscilaetus (Soop) Niskanen & Liimat. (2022)
