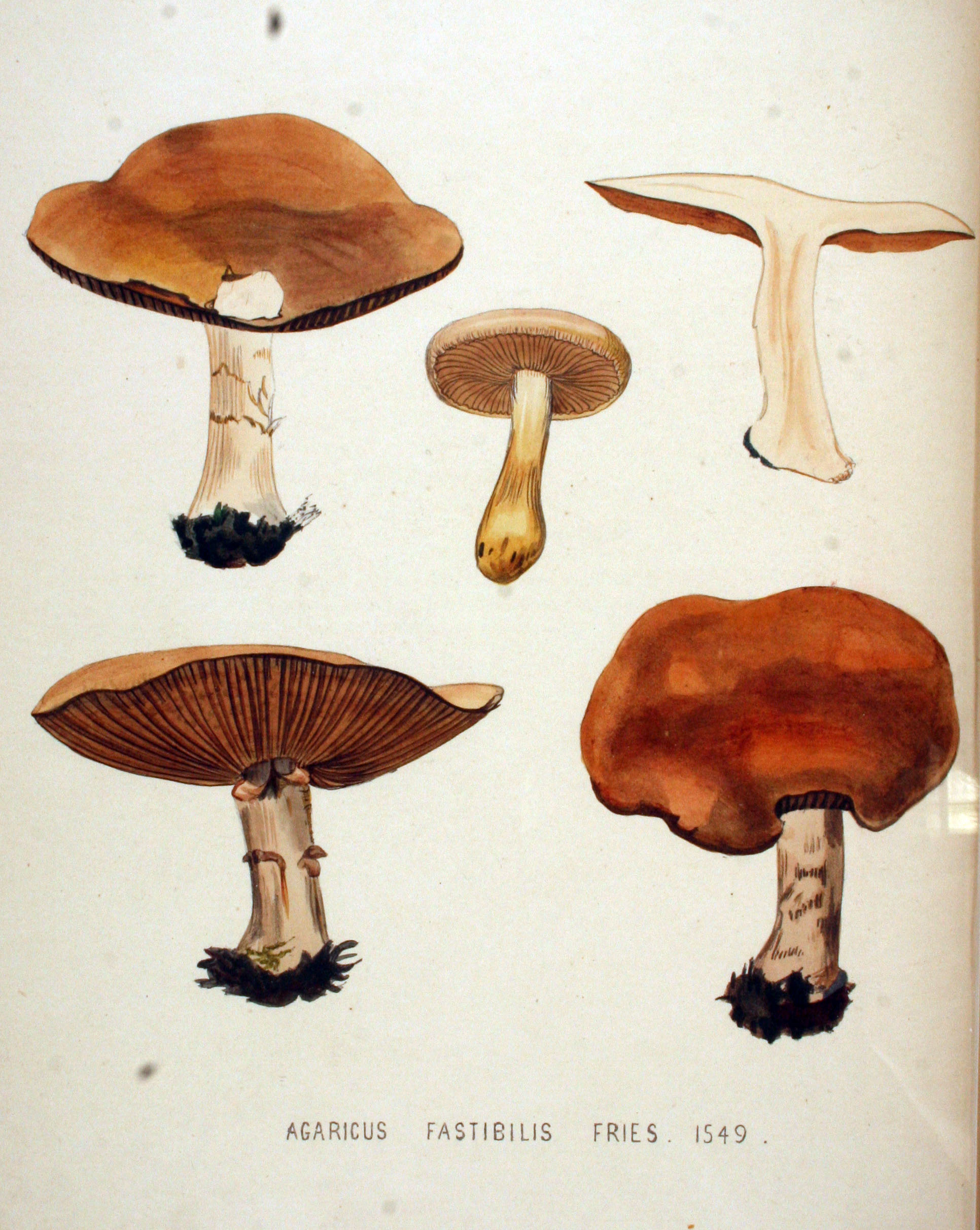

Scientific classification
- Domain: Eukaryota
- Kingdom: Fungi
- Division: Basidiomycota
- Class: Agaricomycetes
- Order: Agaricales
- Family: Hymenogastraceae
- Genus: Hebeloma
- Species: H. fastibile

Binomial name
- Hebeloma fastibile (Pers.) P.Kumm.

= Hebeloma fastibile =

Species of fungus

Hebeloma fastibile is a species of mushroom in the family Hymenogastraceae.
