= Aureonarius infucatus =

Scientific classification
- Kingdom: Fungi
- Division: Basidiomycota
- Class: Agaricomycetes
- Order: Agaricales
- Family: Cortinariaceae
- Genus: Aureonarius
- Species: A. infucatus

Binomial name
- Aureonarius infucatus (Fr.) Niskanen & Liimat.

Synonyms
- Cortinarius infucatus Fr.

Species of fungus

Aureonarius infucatus Mycological characteristics
- Gills on hymenium
- Cap is convex
- Hymenium is adnate
- Stipe has a cortina
- Spore print is reddish-brown
- Ecology is mycorrhizal
- Edibility is unknown

Aureonarius infucatus is a species of mushroom in the family Cortinariaceae.

== Description ==
The cap of Aureonarius infucatus is orangish in color, and is about 2.3-4.8 centimeters in diameter. The gills are adnexed to notched, and can be tan or yellowish. The stipe is about 5.2-7.5 centimeters long and 8-9 millimeters wide, and is light orangish. A cortina is present. The spore print is rusty brown.

== Habitat and ecology ==
Aureonarius infucatus is found in mixed coniferous forests in the Pacific Northwest. It is often found at high elevations, and fruits during the autumn season.
