= Hebeloma insigne =

Scientific classification
- Domain: Eukaryota
- Kingdom: Fungi
- Division: Basidiomycota
- Class: Agaricomycetes
- Order: Agaricales
- Family: Hymenogastraceae
- Genus: Hebeloma
- Species: H. insigne

Binomial name
- Hebeloma insigne A.H. Sm., V.S. Evenson & Mitchel

Species of fungus

Hebeloma insigne is a species of mushroom in the family Hymenogastraceae. Along with other species of its genus, it is poisonous and can result in severe gastrointestinal upset.
