= Amanita petalinivolva =

Scientific classification
- Kingdom: Fungi
- Division: Basidiomycota
- Class: Agaricomycetes
- Order: Agaricales
- Family: Amanitaceae
- Genus: Amanita
- Species: A. petalinivolva

Binomial name
- Amanita petalinivolva Wartchow

Species of fungus

Amanita petalinivolva
- Mycological characteristics
- Gills on hymenium
- Cap is convex
- Hymenium is adnate or adnexed
- Stipe has a volva
- Spore print is white
- Ecology is mycorrhizal
- Edibility is unknown

Amanita petalinivolva is a species of fungi that can be found in Brazil, it is in the Amanita genus. It has a yellow cap, veil remnants, unique type of hymenium and pileipellis. It was described in a 2013 study focusing on Brazilian Amanita species, where it was named. It is currently classified in subsection Gemmatae of section Amanita.
