= Pitcairnia lutescens =

Conservation status
- Endangered (IUCN 3.1)

Scientific classification
- Kingdom: Plantae
- Clade: Embryophytes
- Clade: Tracheophytes
- Clade: Spermatophytes
- Clade: Angiosperms
- Clade: Monocots
- Clade: Commelinids
- Order: Poales
- Family: Bromeliaceae
- Genus: Pitcairnia
- Species: P. lutescens

Binomial name
- Pitcairnia lutescens Mez & Sodiro

Species of flowering plant

Pitcairnia lutescens is a species of flowering plant in the family Bromeliaceae. It is endemic to Ecuador, where it is known from three locations. It grows in low Andean forest and it is threatened by conversion of the forest to cropland.
