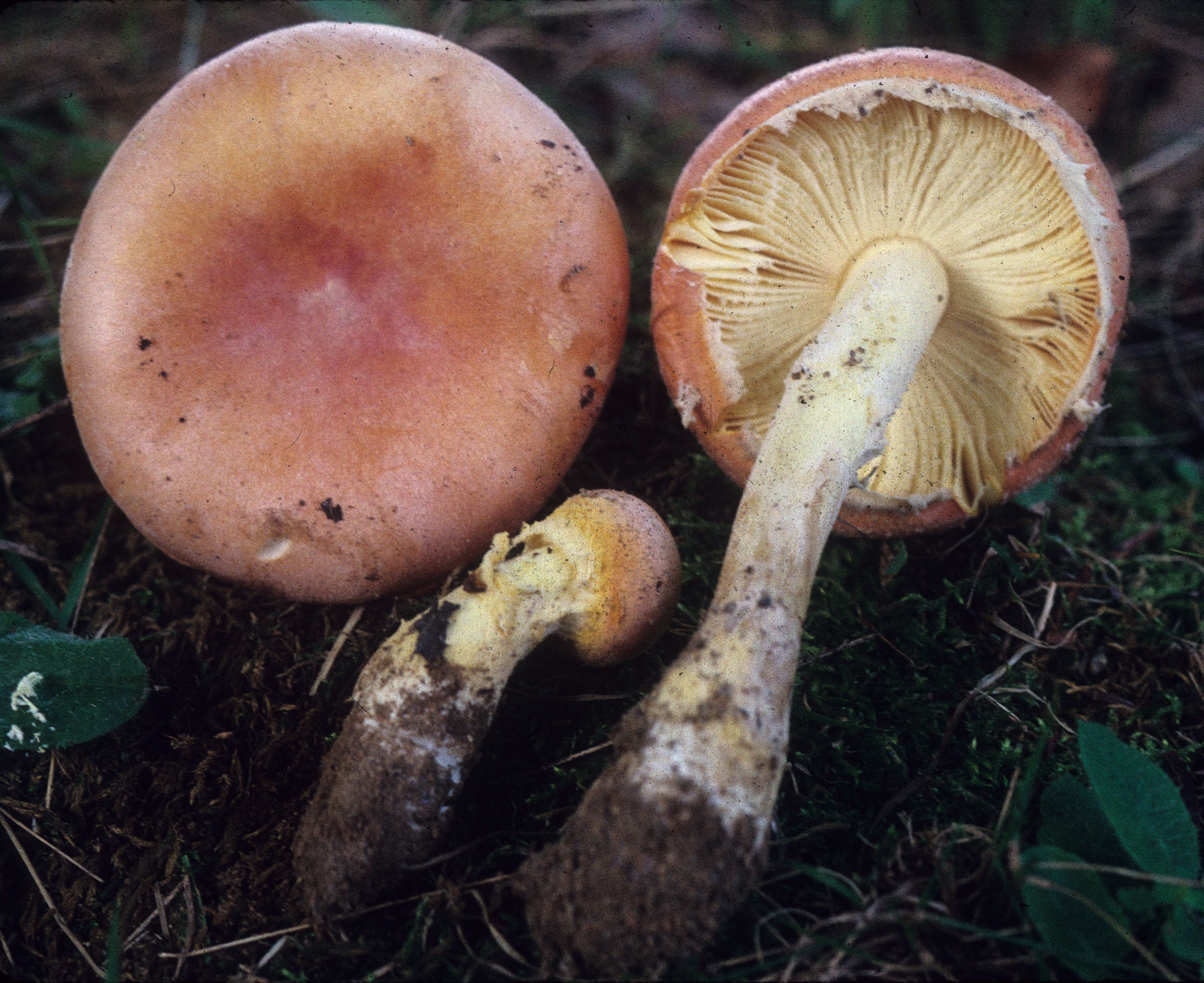

Scientific classification
- Domain: Eukaryota
- Kingdom: Fungi
- Division: Basidiomycota
- Class: Agaricomycetes
- Order: Agaricales
- Family: Amanitaceae
- Genus: Amanita
- Species: A. wellsii

Binomial name
- Amanita wellsii (Murrill) Murrill (1920)

Synonyms
- Venenarius wellsii Murrill (1920)

= Amanita wellsii =

Species of fungus

Amanita wellsii or the salmon amanita is a species of agaric fungus in the family Amanitaceae. It was described by American mycologist William Alphonso Murrill in 1920, based on collections made in Springfield, New Hampshire in 1917. The specific epithet honors Professor H. L. Wells, who had previously studied the species.

The fungus is found in North America with a range extending from the Appalachian Mountains (North Carolina) north to the limit of the distribution of alder in Canada. Fruit bodies grow scattered or in groups on the ground in mixed forests. Its edibility is unknown.

== See also ==
- List of Amanita species
