= Amanita subvaginata =

Scientific classification
- Kingdom: Fungi
- Division: Basidiomycota
- Class: Agaricomycetes
- Order: Agaricales
- Family: Amanitaceae
- Genus: Amanita
- Species: A. subvaginata

Binomial name
- Amanita subvaginata (Cleland & Cheel) E.-J. Gilbert

Species of fungus

Amanita subvaginata
- Mycological characteristics
- Gills on hymenium
- Cap is convex or flat
- Hymenium is free
- Stipe has a volva
- Spore print is white
- Ecology is mycorrhizal
- Edibility is poisonous

Amanita subvaginata, also known as Australian false vaginata, is a species of mycorrhizal fungus from the family Amanitaceae found in Sydney and New South Wales, Australia.

== Description ==
- Cap: The cap is convex, 32 millimetres (1.3 in) wide, and is ashy-grey coloured with a striate margin.
- Gill: They are very close to a stem and are white coloured, and with roughened edges.
- Stem: It is up to 39 millimetres (1.5 in) in length, is solid, stout, and have a powdery covering. It has a bulbous base that is slight. The species volva is located on the side of the bulb is marginate, and is of the same ashy-grey colour as the cap.
- Spores: They are 7.5–9.0 micrometres (0.00030–0.00035 in) in diameter and are globose and inamyloid as well. Six of the spores are 8.7–9.7 millimetres (0.34–0.38 in) high and 7.8–8.8 micrometres (0.00031–0.00035 in) wide in diameter. They are also subglobose and ellipsoid.

== See also ==
- List of Amanita species
