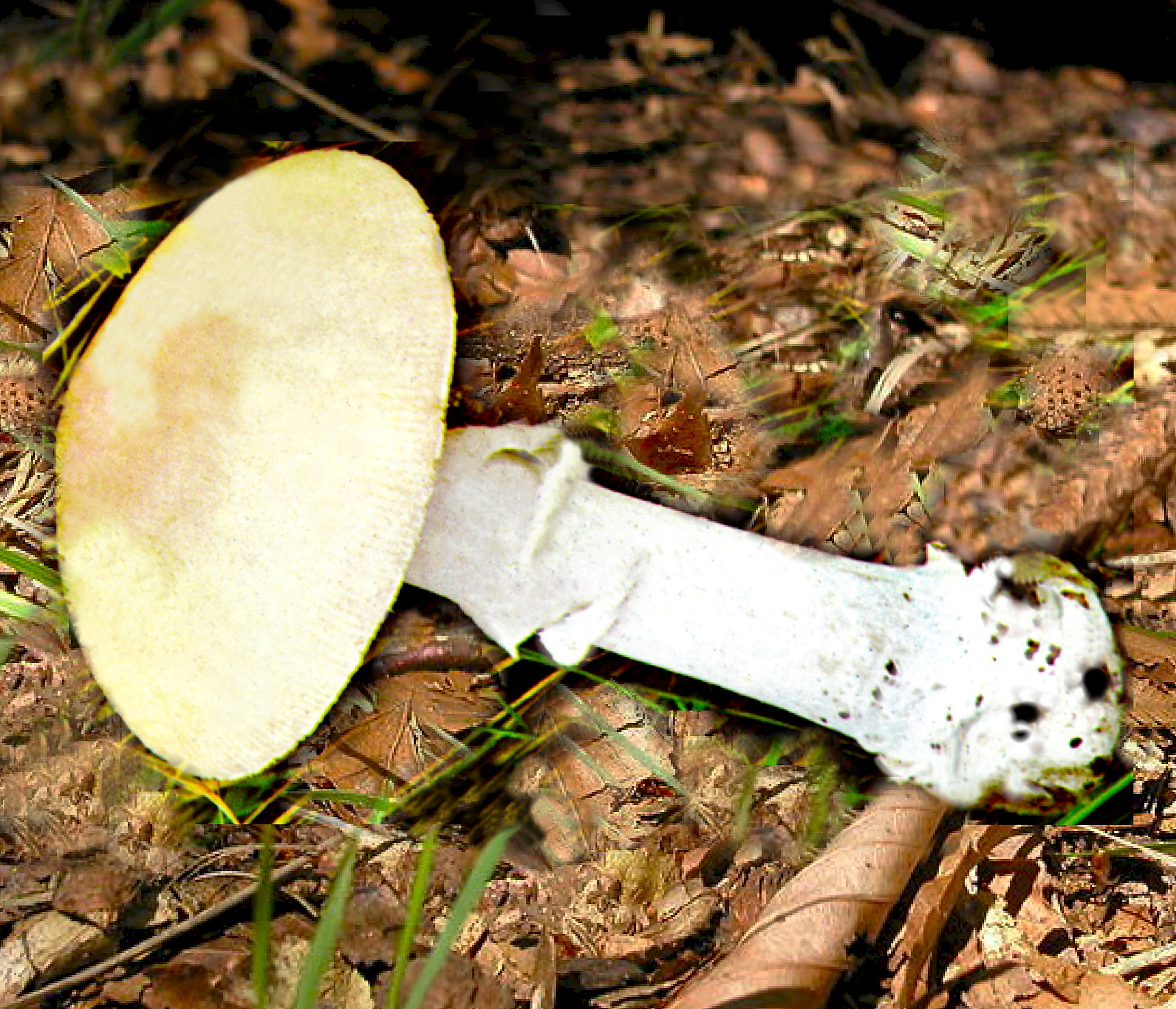

Scientific classification
- Kingdom: Fungi
- Division: Basidiomycota
- Class: Agaricomycetes
- Order: Agaricales
- Family: Amanitaceae
- Genus: Amanita
- Subgenus: A. subg. Amanita
- Species: A. eliae

Binomial name
- Amanita eliae Quél. (1872)

= Amanita eliae =

Species of fungus

Amanita eliae
- Mycological characteristics
- Gills on hymenium
- Hymenium is free
- Stipe has a ring and volva
- Spore print is white
- Ecology is mycorrhizal
- Edibility is inedible

Amanita eliae is an inedible species of fungi in the family of Amanitaceae found in Europe. It was described by Lucien Quélet in 1872. Synonyms include A. eliae, A. godeyi, and A. cordae.

== Description ==
Its cap is 8 to 10 centimetres (3 to 4 inches) or 10 to 15 cm (4 to 6 in) in diameter and 6 to 10 cm (2 1/2 to 4 in) across. It has a white volva. Its warts correspond to easily removable, deep depressions in the cap of the species. Its stem is around 8 to 12 cm (3 to 4 1/2 in) tall and has a diameter of 0.8 to 1.2 cm (1/2 to 1/2 in); it is subcylindric and tapers upwards. The cap and stem have white flesh. The stem is initially entirely white, but browns with age, with a narrow bulb. The stem ring is white. Its stem is smooth and has white gills on the hymenium. Its odour and taste are indistinct.

== Distribution and habitat ==
It is commonly found in Europe in the summer and autumn near coniferous and deciduous trees.
