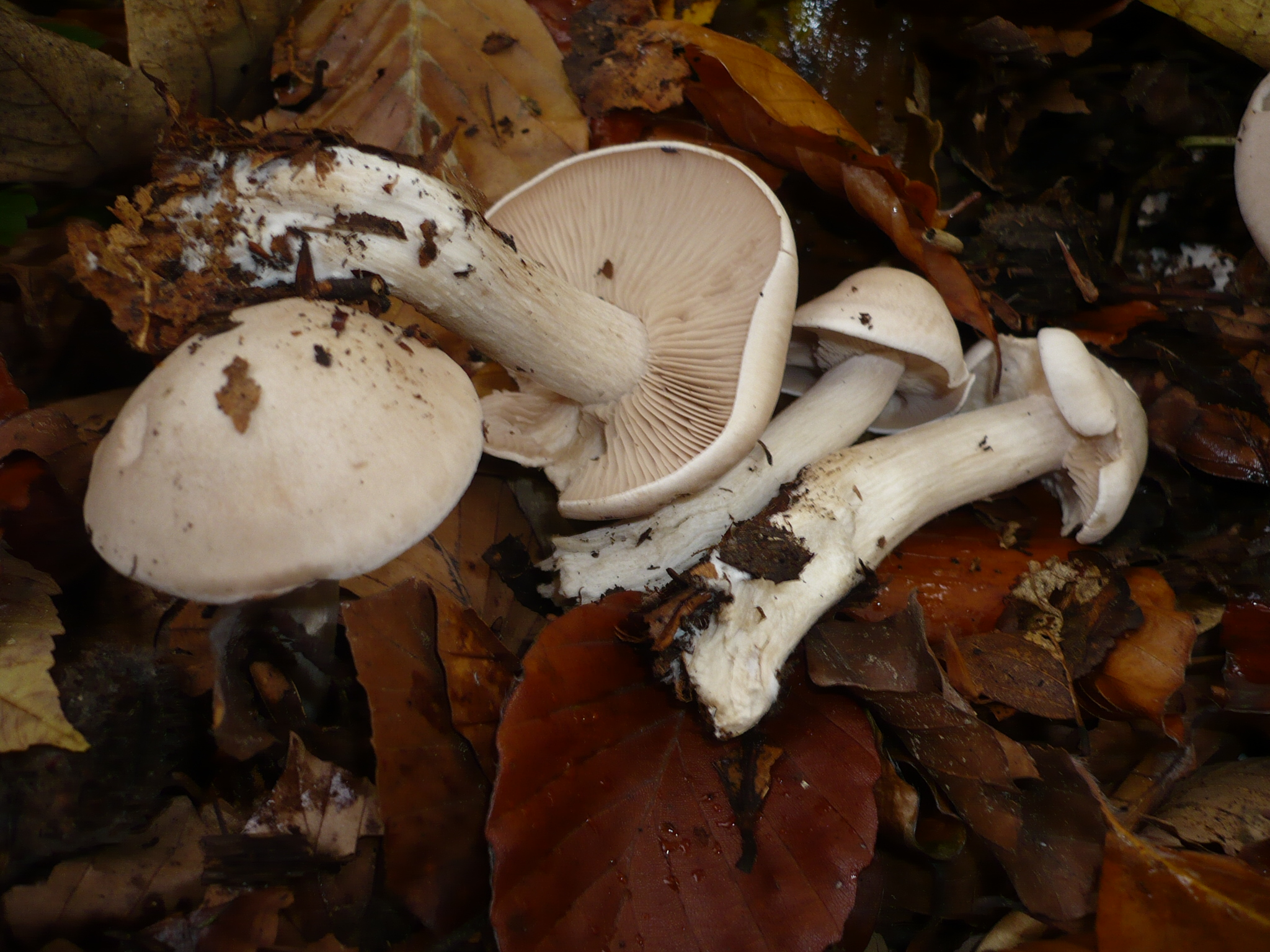

Scientific classification
- Domain: Eukaryota
- Kingdom: Fungi
- Division: Basidiomycota
- Class: Agaricomycetes
- Order: Agaricales
- Family: Tricholomataceae
- Genus: Lepista
- Species: L. irina

Binomial name
- Lepista irina (Fr.) H.E.Bigelow

Synonyms
- Clitocybe irina (Fr.) H. E. Bigelow & A. H. Sm.; Tricholoma irinus (Fr.) P. Kumm; Rhodopaxillus irinus (Fr.) Métrod

= Lepista irina =

Species of fungus

Lepista irina is a species of fungus belonging to the family Tricholomataceae. It is a choice edible mushroom.

It has cosmopolitan distribution.
