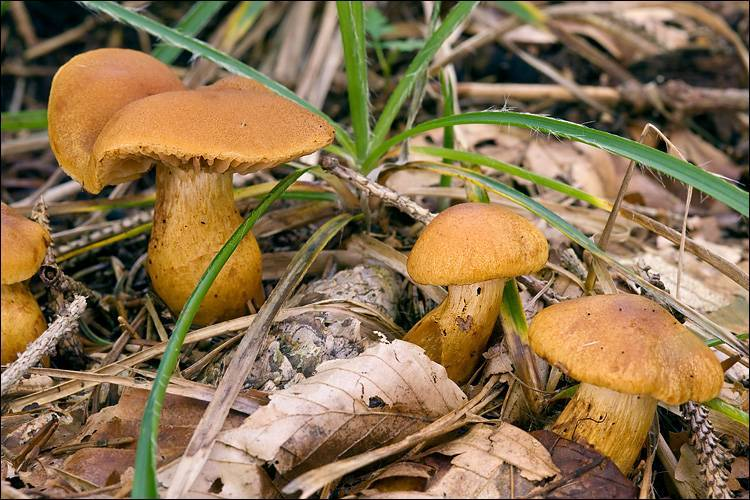

Scientific classification
- Domain: Eukaryota
- Kingdom: Fungi
- Division: Basidiomycota
- Class: Agaricomycetes
- Order: Agaricales
- Family: Cortinariaceae
- Genus: Aureonarius
- Species: A. callisteus

Binomial name
- Aureonarius callisteus (Fr.) Niskanen & Liimat. (2022)

Synonyms
- Agaricus callisteus Fr. (1818); Cortinarius callisteus (Fr.) Fr. (1838); Cortinarius callisteus var. callisteus (Fr.) Fr. (1838); Agaricus abruptus Fr. (1852); Cortinarius infucatus Fr. (1861); Flammula abrupta (Fr.) Sacc. (1887); Gymnopilus abruptus (Fr.) Horniček (1984); Cortinarius callisteus var. abruptus (Fr.) Melot (2007); Cortinarius callisteus var. infucatus (Fr.) Melot (2007)

= Aureonarius callisteus =

Species of fungus

Aureonarius callisteus is a species of agaric fungus in the family Cortinariaceae. The common name of the species is tawny webcap.

== Taxonomy ==
It was first described by Elias Magnus Fries in 1818 as Agaricus callisteus. Two decades later he transferred it to the genus Cortinarius in his 1838 work Epicrisis Systematis Mycologici.

In 2022 the species was transferred from Cortinarius and reclassified as Aureonarius callisteus based on genomic data.

== See also ==
- List of Cortinarius species
