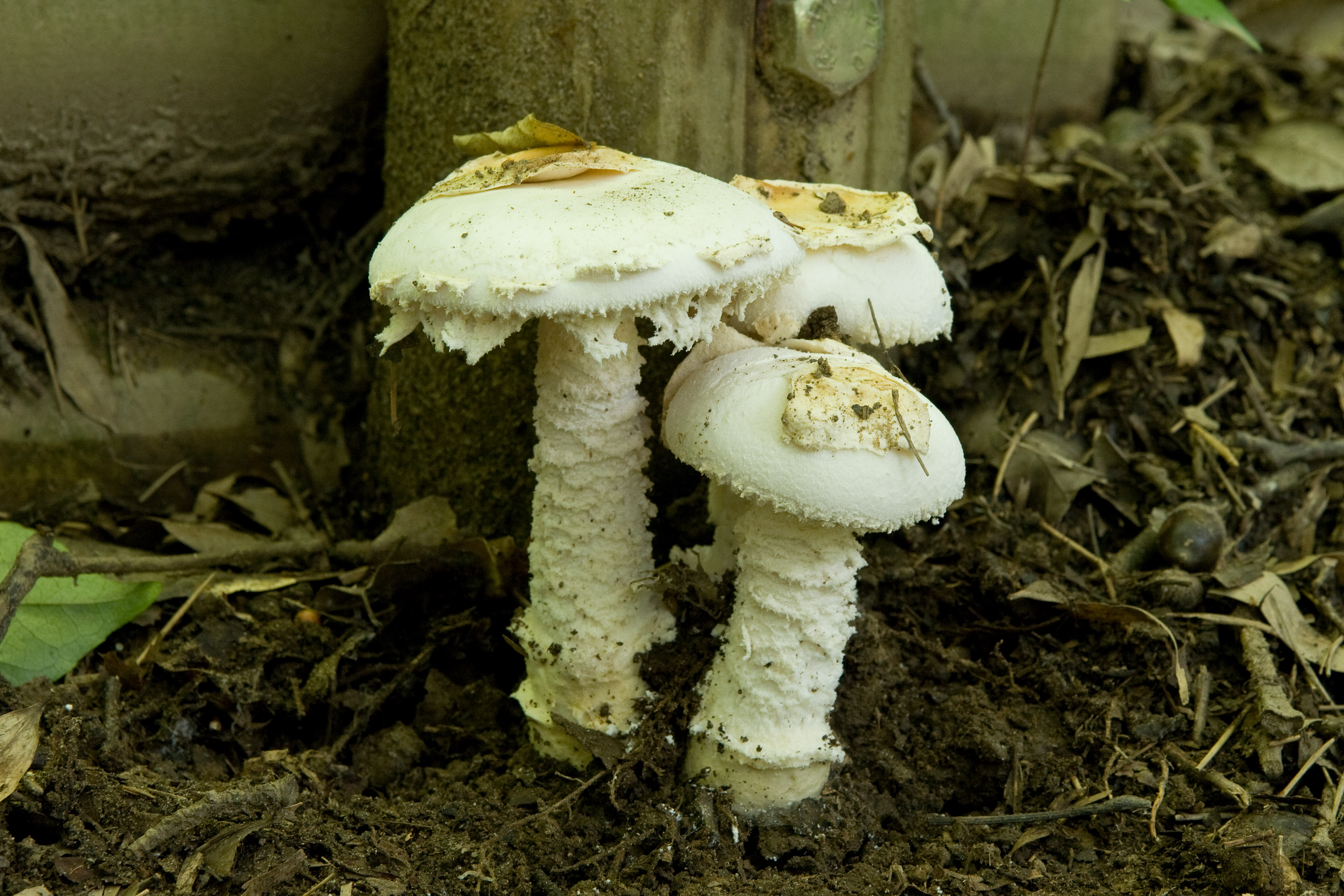

Scientific classification
- Domain: Eukaryota
- Kingdom: Fungi
- Division: Basidiomycota
- Class: Agaricomycetes
- Order: Agaricales
- Family: Amanitaceae
- Genus: Amanita
- Species: A. neo-ovoidea

Binomial name
- Amanita neo-ovoidea Hongo 1976

= Amanita neo-ovoidea =

Species of fungus

Amanita neo-ovoidea is a species of fungus in the family Amanitaceae. It is found in China and Japan.

== Toxicity ==
Consumption of Amanita neo-ovoidea has caused acute renal failure.
