= Amanita parvipantherina =

Scientific classification
- Kingdom: Fungi
- Division: Basidiomycota
- Class: Agaricomycetes
- Order: Agaricales
- Family: Amanitaceae
- Genus: Amanita
- Species: A. parvipantherina

Binomial name
- Amanita parvipantherina Yang Weiß & Oberwinkler, 2004

Species of fungus

Amanita parvipantherina
- Mycological characteristics
- Gills on hymenium
- Cap is convex
- Hymenium is free
- Stipe has a ring and volva
- Spore print is white
- Ecology is mycorrhizal
- Edibility is unknown

Amanita parvipantherina, also known as the Asian small panther amanita, is a Chinese species of agaric which fruits in July and August. It has a brown cap up to 6 centimetres (2 1/2 inches) wide covered with whitish remnants of the universal veil. The stem is up to 9 cm tall. The similar A. pantherina is usually larger and less fragile, with fainter striations around the cap margin.

The species is restricted to Yunnan province in China, where it is strongly associated with Pinus yunnanensis (the Yunnan pine).

== See also ==
- List of Amanita species
