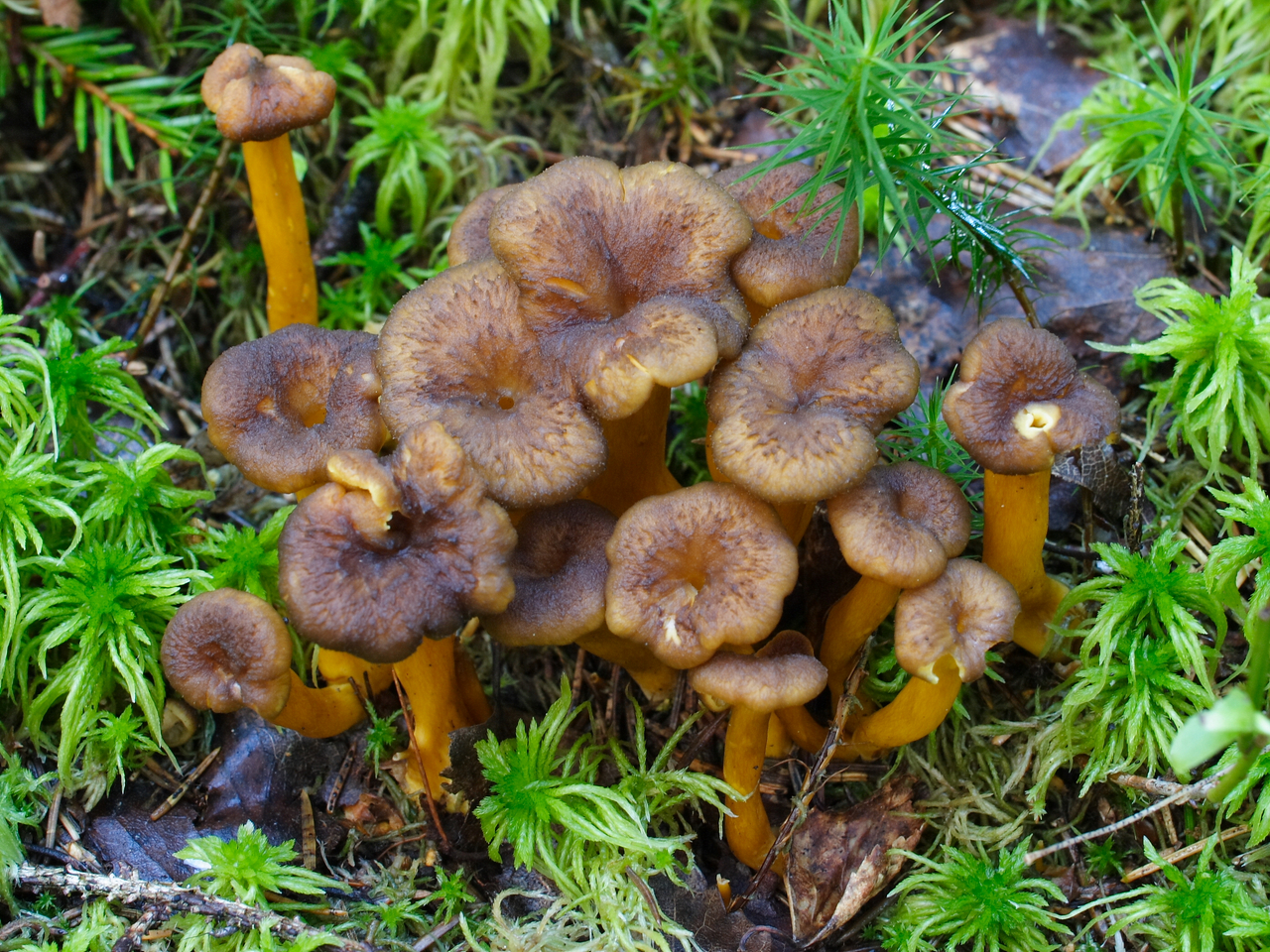

Conservation status
- Least Concern (IUCN 3.1)

Scientific classification
- Kingdom: Fungi
- Division: Basidiomycota
- Class: Agaricomycetes
- Order: Cantharellales
- Family: Cantharellaceae
- Genus: Craterellus
- Species: C. tubaeformis

Binomial name
- Craterellus tubaeformis (Fr.) Quél. 1888

= Craterellus tubaeformis =

Craterellus tubaeformis
- Mycological characteristics
- Ridges on hymenium
- Cap is infundibuliform
- Hymenium is decurrent
- Stipe is bare
- Spore print is cream to salmon
- Ecology is mycorrhizal
- Edibility is choice

Craterellus tubaeformis (formerly Cantharellus tubaeformis) is a species of fungus, also known as the winter chanterelle, yellowfoot, winter mushroom, or funnel chanterelle. It was reclassified from Cantharellus, which has been supported by molecular phylogenetics.

C. tubaeformis is a yellowish-brown and trumpet-shaped mushroom found in great numbers late in the mushroom season, thus earning the common name winter mushroom. The cap is convex and sometimes hollow down the middle. The gills are widely separated and of lighter color than the cap.

The species grows in North America and Asia. It is mycorrhizal, forming symbiotic associations with plants. It is an excellent edible mushroom, especially fried or in soups.

== Taxonomy ==
Molecular phylogenetics has shown that C. tubaeformis deserves its reclassification from Cantharellus to Craterellus. Additionally, it appears that there are two distinct genetic populations that have traditionally been called tubaeformis: one in Europe and eastern North America, and another in western North America. If these two groups are defined as separate species, the "eastern" yellowfoot would retain the scientific epithet tubaeformis due to the origin of the type specimens in Sweden. In 2017, scientists from the Oregon Biodiversity Information Center suggested the classification Craterellus neotubaeformis for the variety found in western North America, but had "still not managed to write the paper".

== Description ==
The mushroom is mostly yellow with a grayish-brown cap. The cap is 1–4 centimetres (1/2–1 1/2 inches) wide, generally flat with a depressed center, funnel-shaped, waxy, with a wavy margin, and mild odor and taste. The gills are shallow, decurrent, forked, and pale. The hollow stalk is 2–12 cm (1–4 1/2 in) tall and 1 cm or less wide. It has a very distinctive smokey, peppery taste when raw.

The spores are whitish, elliptical, and smooth. The spore print is light orangish-pink.

It usually fruits later than other mushrooms, sometimes near Hydnum repandum. It usually grows in large groups.

=== Similar species ===
Cantharellus cibarius (the golden chanterelle) is larger, yellow, and funnel-shaped. It has a weaker but more fruity taste than C. tubaeformis.

Craterellus lutescens vs Craterellus tubaeformis side by side

The edible Craterellus lutescens has wrinkled hymenium without gills, differs slightly in colour and is found only in very wet places. Craterellus odoratus is bright yellow with a seamless cap and stem. Also similar are Cantharellus californicus and Cantharellus formosus (Pacific golden chanterelle).

== Distribution and habitat ==
It grows in temperate and cold parts of North America (near both coasts) and Europe, including Scandinavia, Finland, Russia, and the British Isles, as well as in the Himalayas in Asia, including Assam, in the central parts of the Indian subcontinent, and in Thailand.

Growing in large groups, it is most common in forests with a large amount of well-rotted coarse woody debris, growing on moss or rotten wood, and in North America mostly in conifer bogs. In the Pacific Northwest, it can be found from November to January.

== Ecology ==
The species is mycorrhizal (forming symbiotic associations with plants), providing an obstacle to its cultivation.

The western North American C. tubaeformis has been shown to make ectomycorrhizal relationships with western hemlock (Tsuga heterophylla) and Douglas-fir (Pseudotsuga menziesii).

== Uses ==
Though small, the mushroom is choice. It can be eaten with meat, in soups, pasta, and other dishes.
