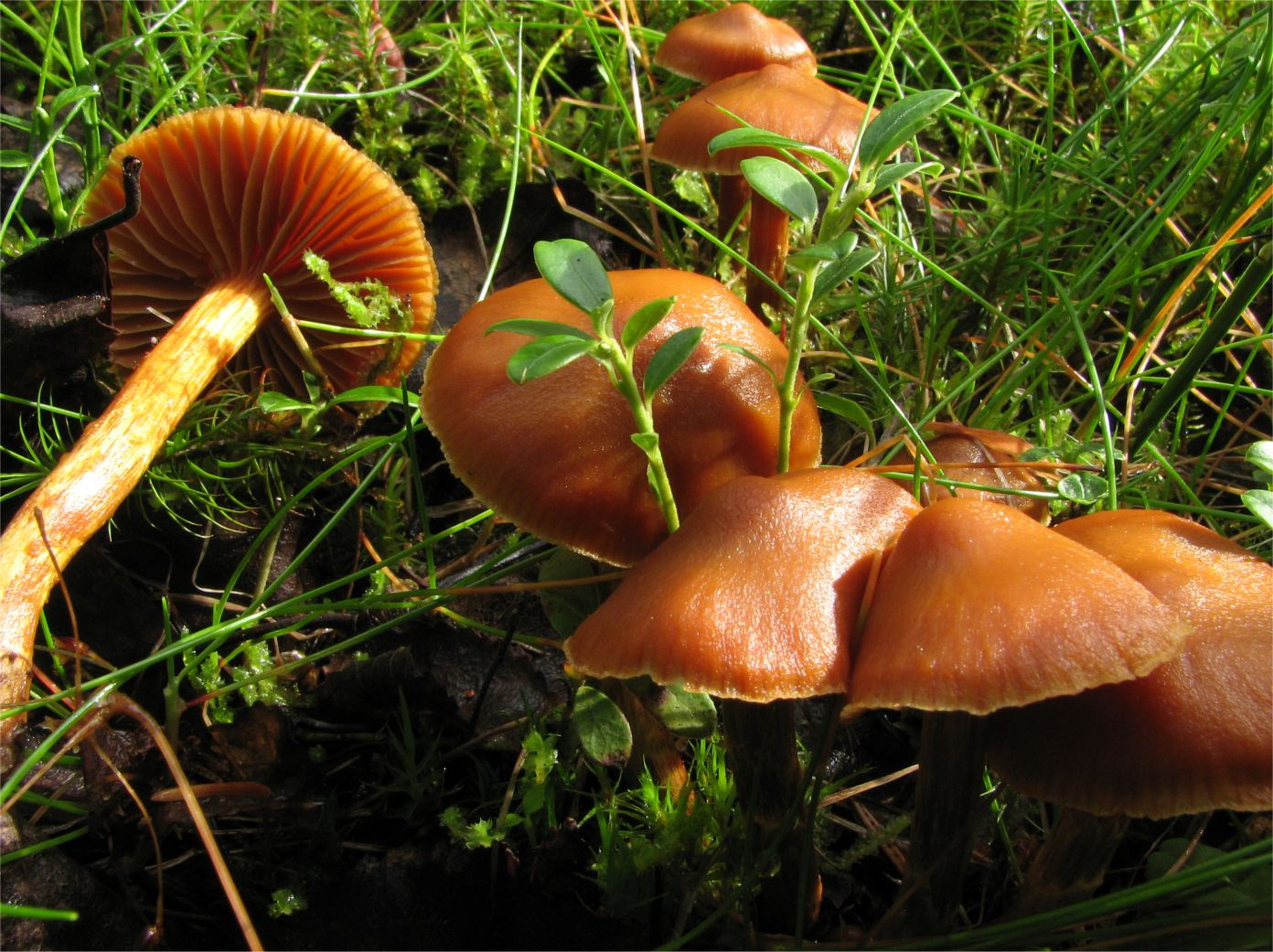

Scientific classification
- Kingdom: Fungi
- Division: Basidiomycota
- Class: Agaricomycetes
- Order: Agaricales
- Family: Cortinariaceae
- Genus: Cortinarius
- Species: C. gentilis

Binomial name
- Cortinarius gentilis (Fr.) Fr. (1838)

Synonyms
- Agaricus helvolus Pers. (1796); Agaricus gentilis Fr. (1821); Telamonia gentilis (Fr.) Wünsche (1877); Lepiota helvola (Pers.) Gray (1821); Hydrocybe helvola (Bull.) M.M.Moser (1953)

= Cortinarius gentilis =

Species of fungus

Cortinarius gentilis
- Mycological characteristics
- Gills on hymenium
- Cap is convex
- Hymenium is adnexed
- Stipe has a cortina
- Spore print is reddish-brown
- Ecology is mycorrhizal
- Edibility is unknown or deadly

Cortinarius gentilis, commonly known as the goldband webcap, is a fungus of the subgenus Telamonia, normally found in North America and Europe.

Previously reported to be a poisonous species, a 2003 Finnish study tested negative for toxicity.

== Description ==
The cap is bright tan, umbonate, and 1–5 centimetres (1/2–2 in) wide. The flesh is tan, with an odour of raw potatoes. The stem is up to 10 cm (4 in) long, resembles a root, and has yellow veil remnants near the bottom. The gills are distant, similarly coloured to the cap but sometimes reddish with age. The spore print is rusty-brown.

== Habitat and distribution ==
It can be found growing separately or in groups in moss under conifer trees. It can be found in North America's Pacific Northwest and Rocky Mountains.

== Alleged toxicity ==
In the 20th century, C. gentilis was considered poisonous in Finnish mycological publications (and deadly by mycologist David Arora). It was reported to belong to subgenus Leprocybe and to contain the toxin orellanine, but these details have since been disputed.

The claim of toxicity primarily stemmed from a study by Möttönen et al. (1975) and a case study by Hulmi et al. (1975). When a specimen from the former study was reexamined, it turned out to be labelled as the highly toxic C. speciosissimus. The authors of a 2003 study analysed 28 Finnish samples of the species. An unspecific cell culture toxicity test and a feeding test on mice revealed no signs of toxicity.
