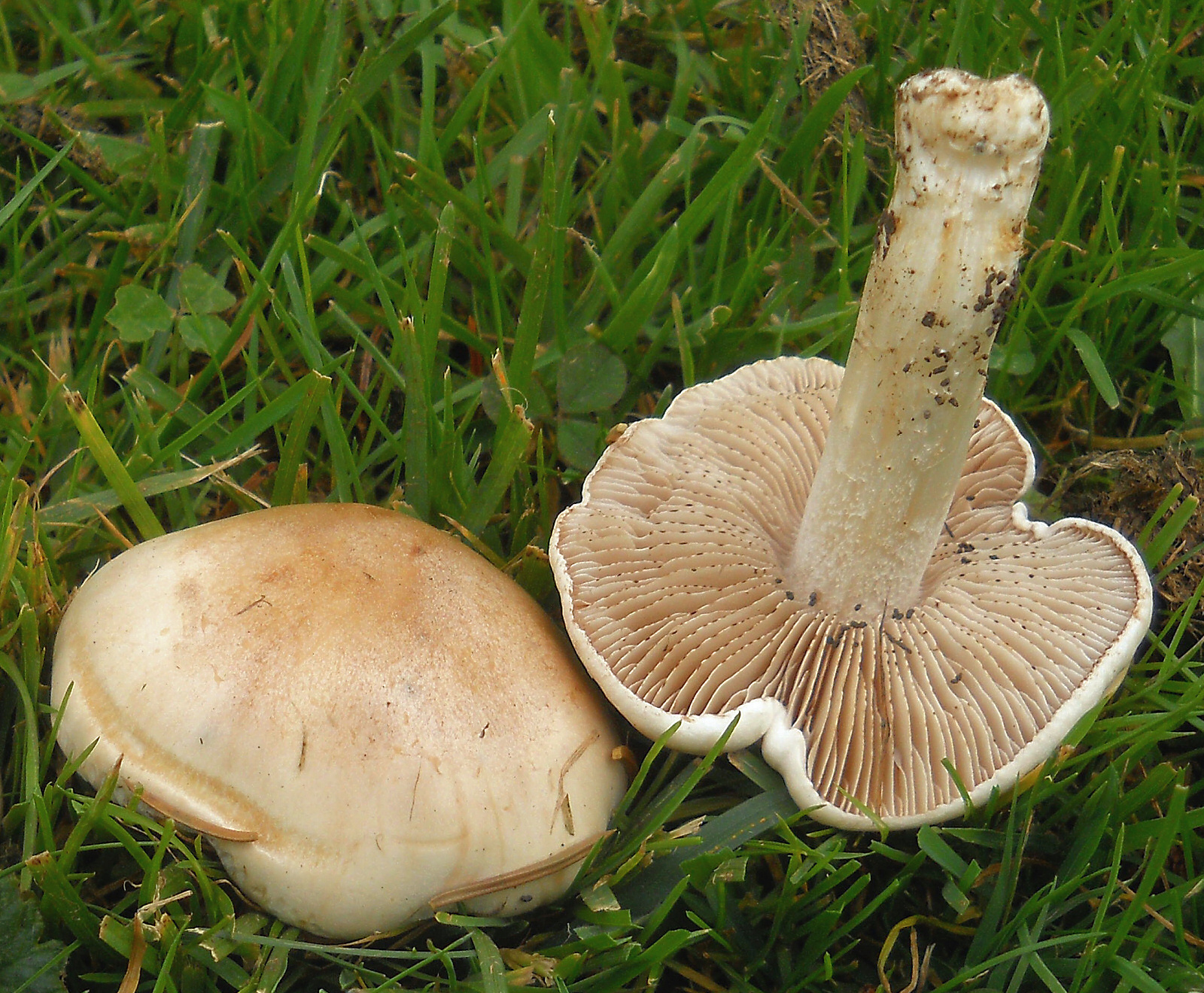

Scientific classification
- Kingdom: Fungi
- Division: Basidiomycota
- Class: Agaricomycetes
- Order: Agaricales
- Family: Hymenogastraceae
- Genus: Hebeloma
- Species: H. crustuliniforme

Binomial name
- Hebeloma crustuliniforme (Bull. ex St. Amans.) Quél.

= Hebeloma crustuliniforme =

Species of fungus

Hebeloma crustuliniforme Mycological characteristics
- Gills on hymenium
- Cap is umbonate
- Hymenium is adnate
- Stipe is bare
- Spore print is brown
- Ecology is mycorrhizal
- Edibility is poisonous

Hebeloma crustuliniforme, commonly known as poison pie or fairy cakes, is a gilled mushroom of the genus Hebeloma. It is found in both the Old and New World and is poisonous.

== Taxonomy ==
The species' specific name derives from the Latin crustulum ('little biscuit').

== Description ==
The buff-to-beige cap is 3–11 centimetres (1 1/4–4 1/4 inches) in diameter, convex then umbonate with an uplifted margin in age. The gills are crowded, adnate or notched, initially pale but browning with age, and beaded with droplets in moist conditions. The stipe is 4–13 cm long and 0.5–1.5 cm (1/4–1/2 in) thick, with a wider base and no ring. The thick flesh is white and has a radish-like smell and bitter taste.

The spores are brown, elliptical, and somewhat rough.

=== Similar species ===
Similar species include Hebeloma sinapizans and H. insigne.

== Distribution and habitat ==
The species has been found in 18 countries, including most parts of Europe, both coasts of North America, and less frequently in Victoria, Australia.

A common mushroom, it be found in open woodland and heathland in summer and autumn, though may also be found in winter in places with milder climates such as California. According to David Arora, it is "by far" the most common Hebeloma found in California.

== Toxicity ==
This fungus is poisonous, causing mild to severe gastrointestinal upset, including vomiting, diarrhea, and colicky abdominal pain several hours after consumption.
