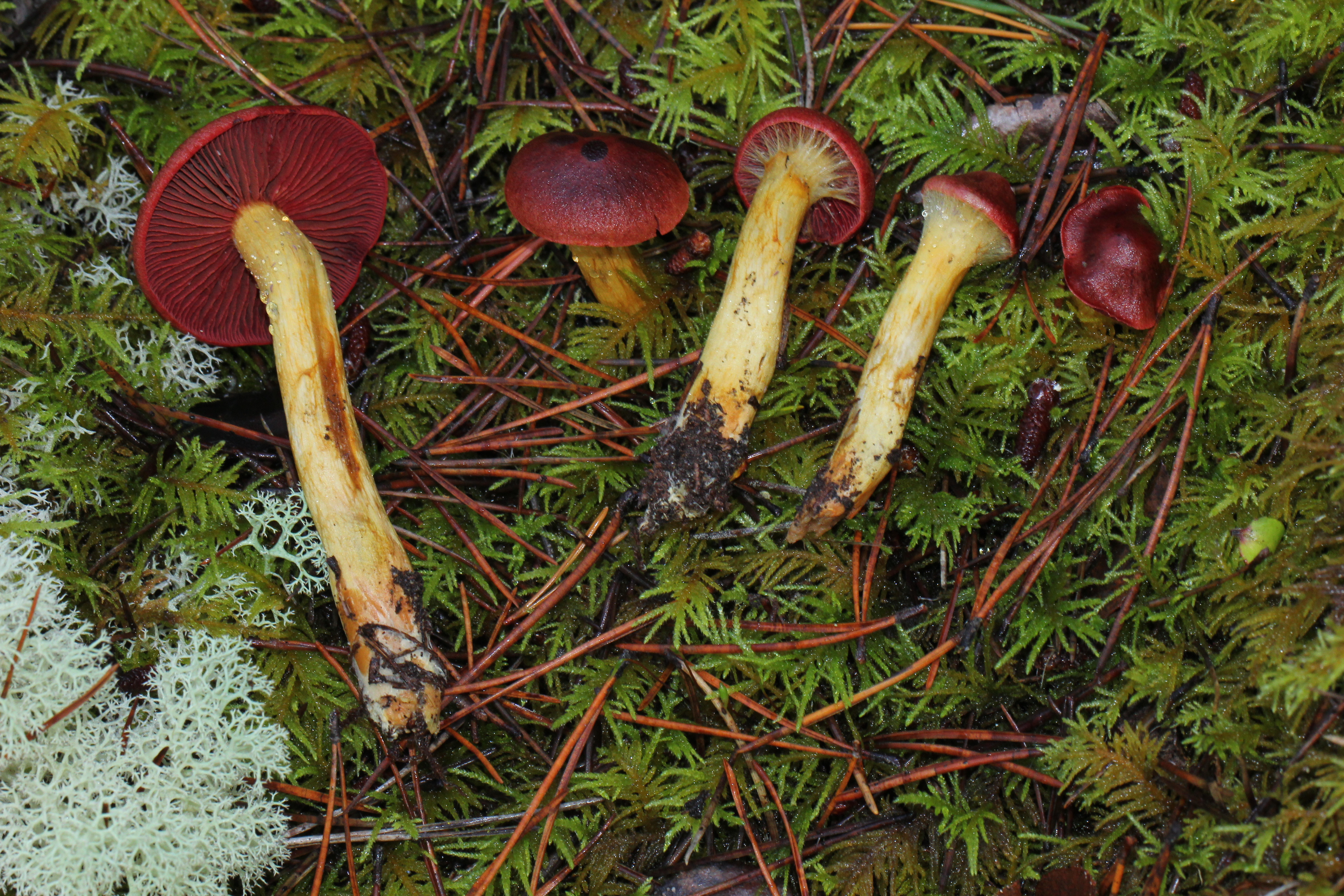

Scientific classification
- Domain: Eukaryota
- Kingdom: Fungi
- Division: Basidiomycota
- Class: Agaricomycetes
- Order: Agaricales
- Family: Cortinariaceae
- Genus: Cortinarius
- Species: C. smithii

Binomial name
- Cortinarius smithii Ammirati, Niskanen & Liimat. (2012)

Synonyms
- Cortinarius phoeniceus var. occidentalis A.H.Sm. (1939)

= Cortinarius smithii =

Species of fungus

Cortinarius smithii, also known as the western red dye mushroom, is an agaric fungus of the genus Cortinarius. Originally named Cortinarius phoeniceus var. occidentalis by American mycologist Alexander H. Smith in 1939, it was renamed to honor Smith in 2012, after molecular analysis revealed that it was genetically different from Cortinarius phoeniceus. It is found in North America.

This mushroom is prized as a source of natural dye. According to Mushrooms of the Redwood Coast (2016), it is the "holy grail of California dye mushrooms" and when used with "a neutral pH (around 7) and an alum mordant" for the red and a pH of 4 for orange.

== See also ==
- List of Cortinarius species

== Sources ==
- Siegel, Noah; Schwarz, Christian (2016). Mushrooms of the Redwood Coast: A Comprehensive Guide to the Fungi of Coastal Northern California. Clarkson Potter/Ten Speed. ISBN 9781607748182. LCCN 2015027853. OCLC 956478776.
