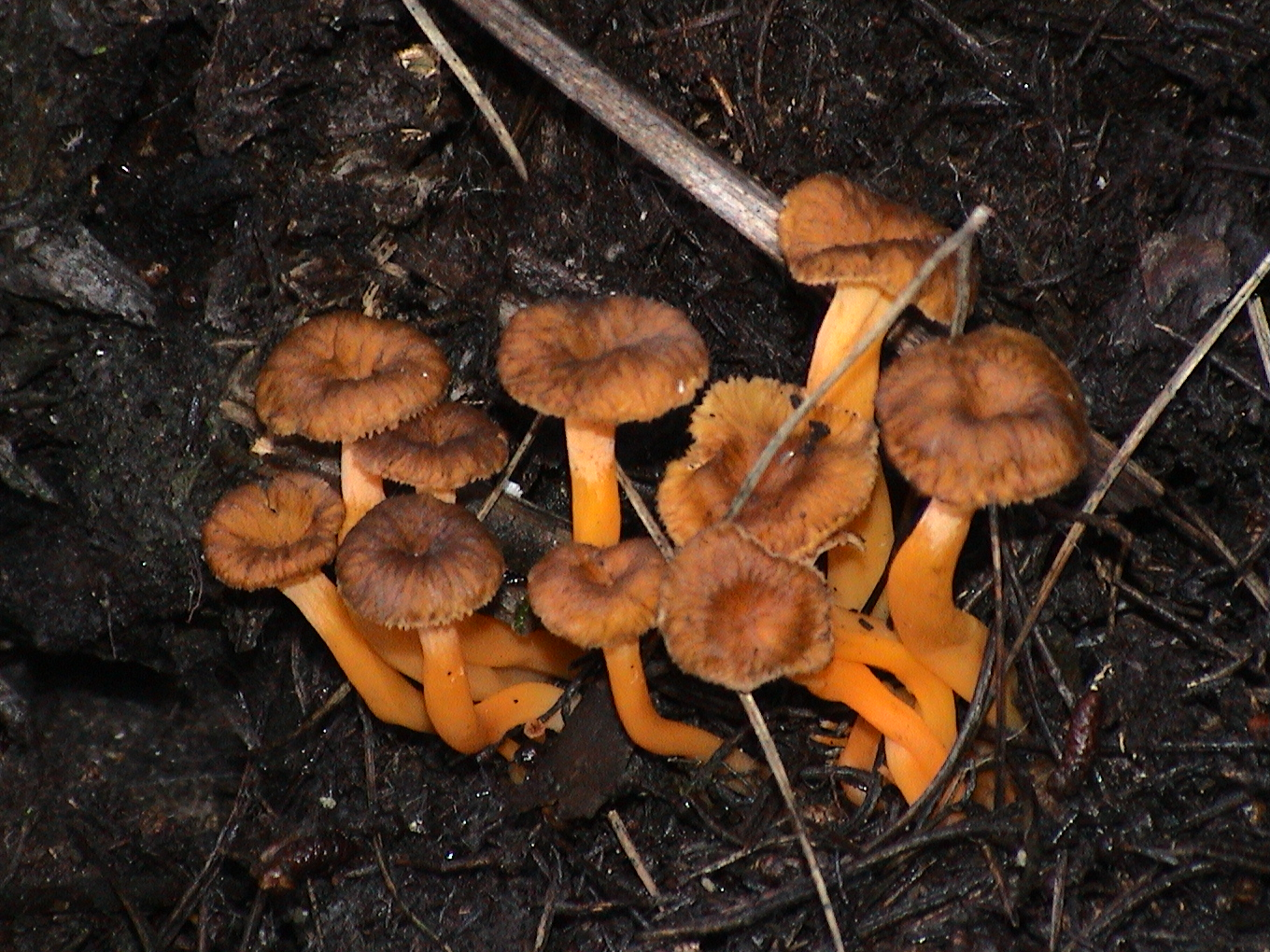

Scientific classification
- Kingdom: Fungi
- Division: Basidiomycota
- Class: Agaricomycetes
- Order: Cantharellales
- Family: Cantharellaceae
- Genus: Craterellus
- Species: C. lutescens

Binomial name
- Craterellus lutescens (Fr.) Fr.

= Craterellus lutescens =

Species of fungus

Craterellus lutescens
- Mycological characteristics
- Ridges on hymenium
- Cap is infundibuliform
- Hymenium is decurrent
- Stipe is bare
- Spore print is cream to salmon
- Ecology is mycorrhizal
- Edibility is edible

Craterellus lutescens, formerly sometimes called Cantharellus lutescens or Cantharellus xanthopus or Cantharellus aurora, commonly known as Yellow Foot, camagroc in Catalan, craterelle jaune in French, is a species of mushroom. It is closely related to Craterellus tubaeformis. Its hymenium is usually orange or white, whereas the hymenium of C. tubaeformis is grey. C. lutescens is also usually found in wetlands.

== Description ==
The species is more brightly coloured than Craterellus tubaeformis. The cap is lobed irregularly and is brown to bistre. The hymenium and stipe are also more brightly coloured than C. tubaeformis. The hymenium is almost smooth or slightly veined. The stipe is yellow-orange. The species is edible.

Craterellus lutescens vs Craterellus tubaeformis side by side

== Habitat ==
The species can commonly be found in large colonies in some coniferous forests, under spruce, mountain fir trees, or pinewoods near the seashore.

== Research ==
An extract of Craterellus lutescens exhibits inhibitory activity on thrombin.
