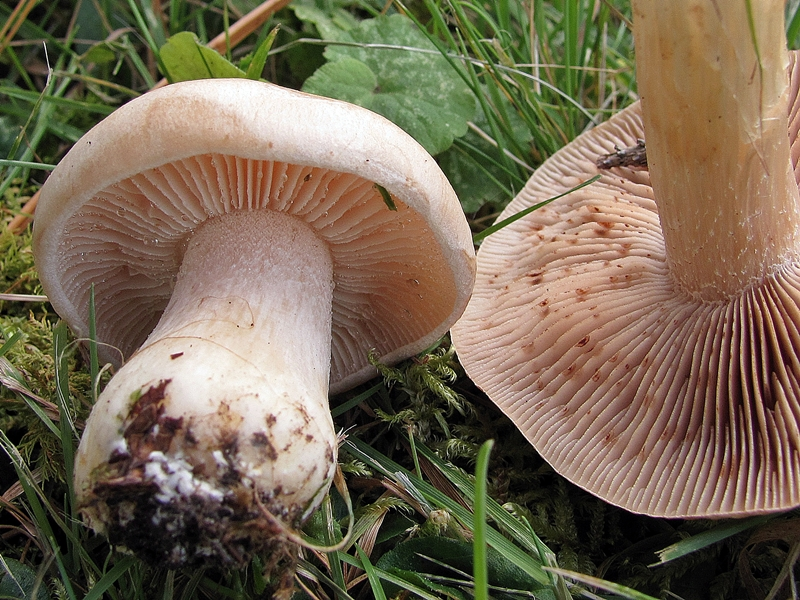
- H. crustuliniforme

Scientific classification
- Kingdom: Fungi
- Division: Basidiomycota
- Class: Agaricomycetes
- Order: Agaricales
- Family: Hymenogastraceae
- Genus: Hebeloma (Fr.) P.Kumm. (1871)

Type species
- Hebeloma fastibile (Pers.) P.Kumm. (1871)

= Hebeloma =

Genus of fungi

Hebeloma is a genus of fungi in the family Hymenogastraceae. Found worldwide, it contains the poison pie or fairy cakes (Hebeloma crustuliniforme) and the ghoul fungus (H. aminophilum), from Western Australia, which grows on rotting animal remains.

== Taxonomy ==
The placement of the genus Hebeloma within the fungal taxonomic tree has varied over time. Historically it has been most often placed in the order Agaricales but was placed Cortinariales in the 8th edition of the Dictionary of the Fungi. The most recent inter-generic placement (Knudsen & Vesterholt, 2nd ed, 2012)) places it the family Hymenogastraceae within Agaricales.

=== Etymology ===
The generic name is a compound Ancient Greek word hēbē (ἥβη), "youth" or "puberty" and the suffix -loma (λόμα), a fringe (pertaining to the fungal veil). Thus, Hebeloma translates as "fringe of youth", in reference to how the fungal veil is only seen in immature specimens.

== See also ==
- List of Hebeloma species
