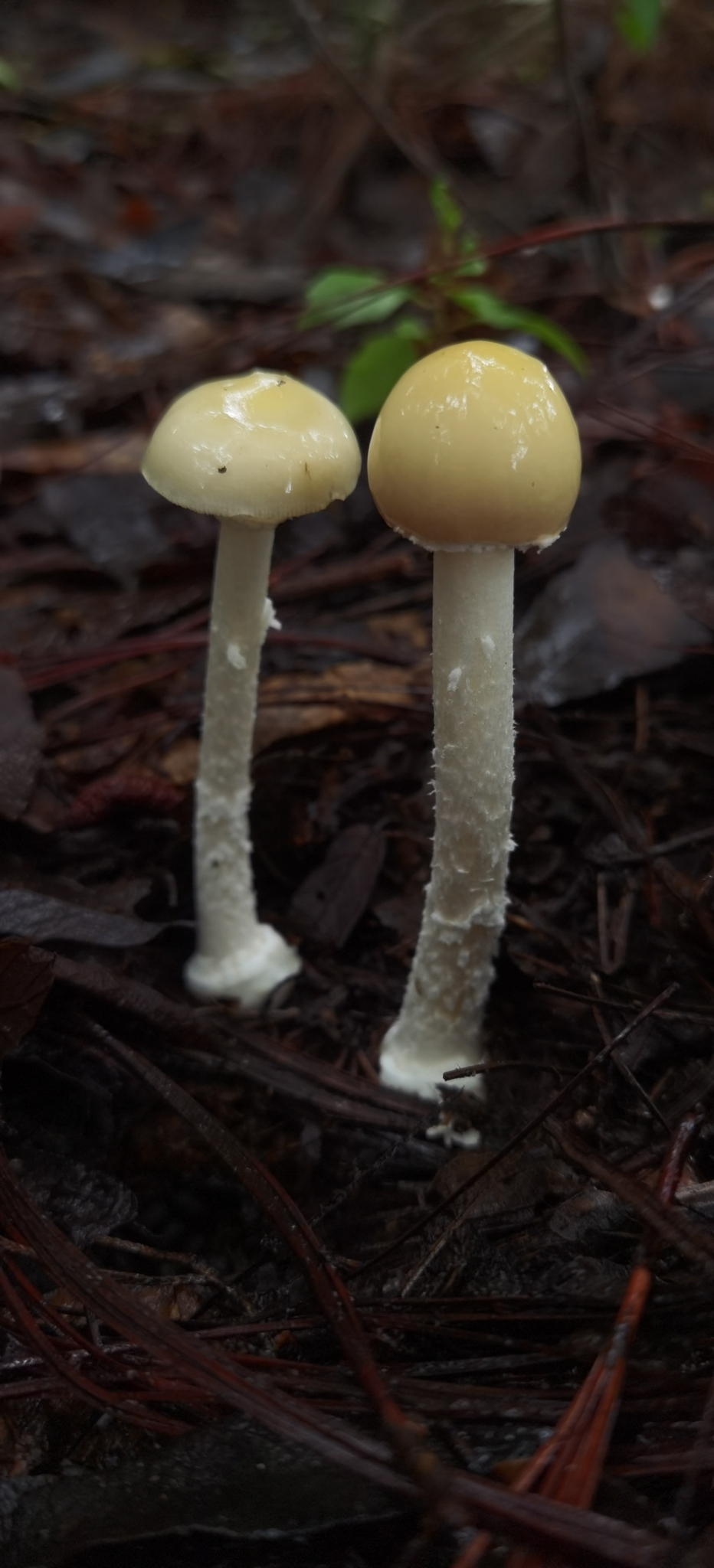
- Its distinctive collared volva and cap.

Scientific classification
- Kingdom: Fungi
- Division: Basidiomycota
- Class: Agaricomycetes
- Order: Agaricales
- Family: Amanitaceae
- Genus: Amanita
- Species: A. xylinivolva

Binomial name
- Amanita xylinivolva Tulloss, Ovrebo & Halling

= Amanita xylinivolva =

Species of fungus

Amanita xylinivolva
- Mycological characteristics
- Gills on hymenium
- Cap is convex
- Hymenium is free or adnate
- Stipe has a volva
- Spore print is white
- Ecology is mycorrhizal
- Edibility is poisonous or deadly

Amanita xylinivolva, the cottony volva amanita, is a species of fungus found in Andean Colombia. It is in the family Amanitaceae and was originally described by Tulloss, Ovrebo, and Halling in 1992.

== Etymology ==
The name xylinivolva comes from the Greek xylinus (meaning "cottony" or "pertaining to cotton") and volva, referring to the distinctive cottony, submembranous material of the universal veil.

== Description ==
Amanita xylinivolva is a small to medium-sized mushroom with a yellow to yellowish cream or buff-colored cap. The margin of the cap exhibits sulcate to tuberculate-sulcate striations. Fragments of the cottony, pale universal veil may be present on the cap surface or at the junction of the stipe and its swollen bulb. The species was previously collected in 1978 by Guzmán and Carela, who initially identified it as a member of the Amanita gemmata group. It can be distinguished from A. gemmata by its predominantly subglobose spores.

== Habitat and distribution ==
Amanita xylinivolva was first discovered when they were found in the Andes of Colombia growing with Quercus humboldtii and Weinmannia tomentosa. Some reports say it grows in Guatemala, but the full range is not known.

== Toxicity ==
Biochemical analysis of Colombian specimens showed that Amanita xylinivolva contains the potent toxin α-amanitin, with concentrations ranging from approximately 50 to 6 000 ppm, detected in both caps and stipes. It is recorded in fungal databases as being used as a poison. Consumption of α-amanitin–containing mushrooms can lead to severe liver and renal failure, sometimes fatal.
