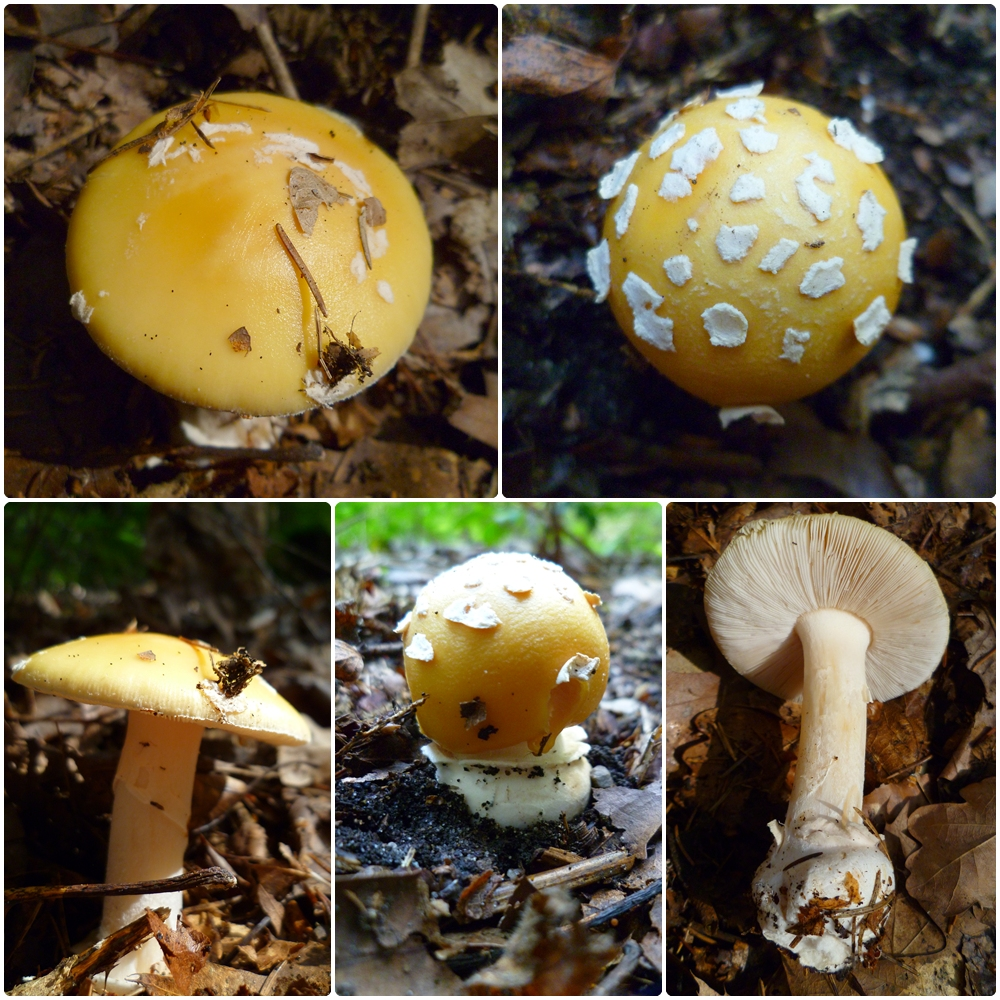
- In different stages of development

Scientific classification
- Kingdom: Fungi
- Division: Basidiomycota
- Class: Agaricomycetes
- Order: Agaricales
- Family: Amanitaceae
- Genus: Amanita
- Species: A. gemmata

Binomial name
- Amanita gemmata (Fr.) Bertill. (1866)

Synonyms
- List: Agaricus gemmatus Fr. (1838); Agaricus adnatus W.G.Sm. (1870); Amanita gemmata (Fr.) Gillet (1874); Amanita junquillea Quél. (1876); Amanita gemmata f. amici Gillet (1884); Amanita muscaria var. gemmata (Fr.) Quél. (1886); Amanitopsis adnata (W.G.Sm.) Sacc. (1887); Amanitopsis gemmata (Fr.) Sacc. (1887); Amanita adnata (W.G.Sm.) Sacc. (1925); Amanita junquillea var. exannulata J.E.Lange (1935); Amanitaria gemmata (Fr.) E.-J.Gilbert (1940); Venenarius gemmatus (Fr.) Murrill (1948)

= Amanita gemmata =

Species of mushroom-forming fungus

Amanita gemmata, commonly known as the gemmed amanita or the jonquil amanita, is an agaric mushroom of the family Amanitaceae and genus Amanita. The fruit body has a cap that is a dull to golden shade of yellow, and typically 2.5–12 centimetres (1–4 3/4 inches) in diameter. The cap surface is sticky when moist, and characterized by white warts, which are easily detached. It is initially convex, and flattens out when mature. The flesh is white and does not change colour when cut. The gills are white and closely spaced. The stem is pale yellow, and measures 4–12 cm (1 5/8–4 3/4 in) long by 0.5–1.9 cm (1/4–3/4 in) thick. The partial veil that covers the young fruit body turns into the ring on the stem at maturity. The spore print is white. It resembles numerous other species.

This species is a mycorrhizal fungus, widespread in Europe. It can grow either singly, scattered, or in groups. It prefers habitats like coniferous and mixed forests and alongside paths, where it fruits in summer and fall. It is a toxic mushroom, containing ibotenic acid and muscimol.

== Taxonomy ==
- - - - Amanita muscaria
      - - Amanita roseitincta
        - Amanita gemmata
    - Amanita farinosa
  - - - - Amanita ceciliae
        - Amanita fulva
      - Amanita vaginata
    - Amanita jacksonii

Phylogeny and relationships of A. gemmata and related species based on combined analyses of nLSU-DNA and mtSSU-DNA sequences.

The species was first described scientifically by Swedish mycologist and botanist Elias Magnus Fries as Agaricus gemmatus in 1838. It was transferred to the genus Amanita in 1866 by the French statistician Louis Bertillon. The species has been transferred to several genera in its history, resulting in a number of synonyms, including Amanita muscaria var. gemmata (1886, Lucien Quélet), Amanitopsis gemmata (1887, Pier Andrea Saccardo), Amanitaria gemmata (1940, Jean-Edouard Gilbert), and Venenarius gemmatus (1948, William Murrill). Amanita authority Rodham E. Tulloss considers A. amici (published by Claude Casimir Gillet in 1891) to be synonymous with A. gemmata, as the macroscopic characteristics of the former fall within the limits of the range expected for the latter.

Within the genus Amanita, A. gemmata is classified in subgenus Amanita, section Amanita, subsection Gemmatae, and series Gemmatae. Tulloss places the species in a stirps (an informal ranking above species level) with A. russuloides and A. viscidolutea. Some mycologists believe that A. gemmata is not different from A. russuloides. Two molecular studies based on sequences of the large ribosomal subunit RNA gene (nLSU-rDNA) and the mitochondrial small ribosomal subunit RNA gene (mtSSU-rDNA) show that A. gemmata is part of a clade within Amanita with its close relatives A. muscaria, A. farinosa and A. roseitincta.

The mushroom is commonly known as the "gemmed Amanita", the "jonquil Amanita", or the "European gemmed Amanita".

Amanita gemmata
- Mycological characteristics
- Gills on hymenium
- Cap is convex or flat
- Hymenium is adnate or adnexed
- Stipe has a ring
- Spore print is white
- Ecology is mycorrhizal
- Edibility is poisonous or psychoactive

== Description ==
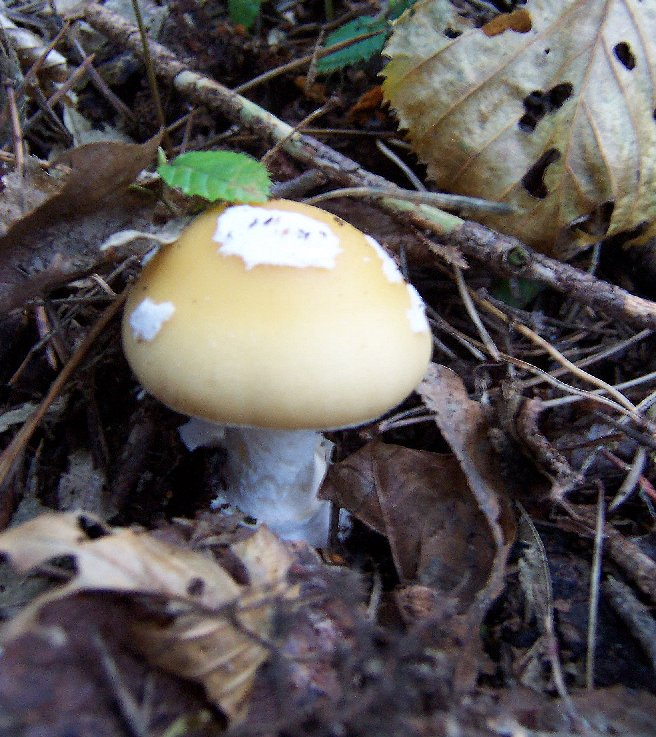
Young specimen after several days of dry weather (note pale color of dry cap)

The fruit bodies are colored yellow overall. The fresh cap, ranging in color from dull creamy yellow to golden yellow to buff, is sticky when moist. White warts adorn the cap surface, but they are usually flimsy and easily washed away by rain. They are placed randomly, but tend to be more concentrated in the center. The cap is typically 2.5–12 centimetres (1–4 3/4 inches) in diameter, and initially convex before flattening out in maturity. The flesh is white, and shows no change when sliced.

The gills are adnate to adnexed, and white; they are close together, with little intervening space. The pale yellowish stem is 4–12 cm (1 5/8–4 3/4 in) long by 0.5–1.9 cm (1/4–3/4 in) thick, and either roughly equal in width throughout, or slightly thicker at the base. Young mushrooms have a membranous partial veil extending from the upper stem to the cap margin; as the mushroom grows, the partial veil tears to leave a flimsy, skirt-like, easily lost ring on the stem. At the base of the stem is a white volva (a remnant of the universal veil that covered the immature mushroom) that usually forms a small, free rim. The spore print is white. There is no distinctive odour.

=== Microscopic characteristics ===
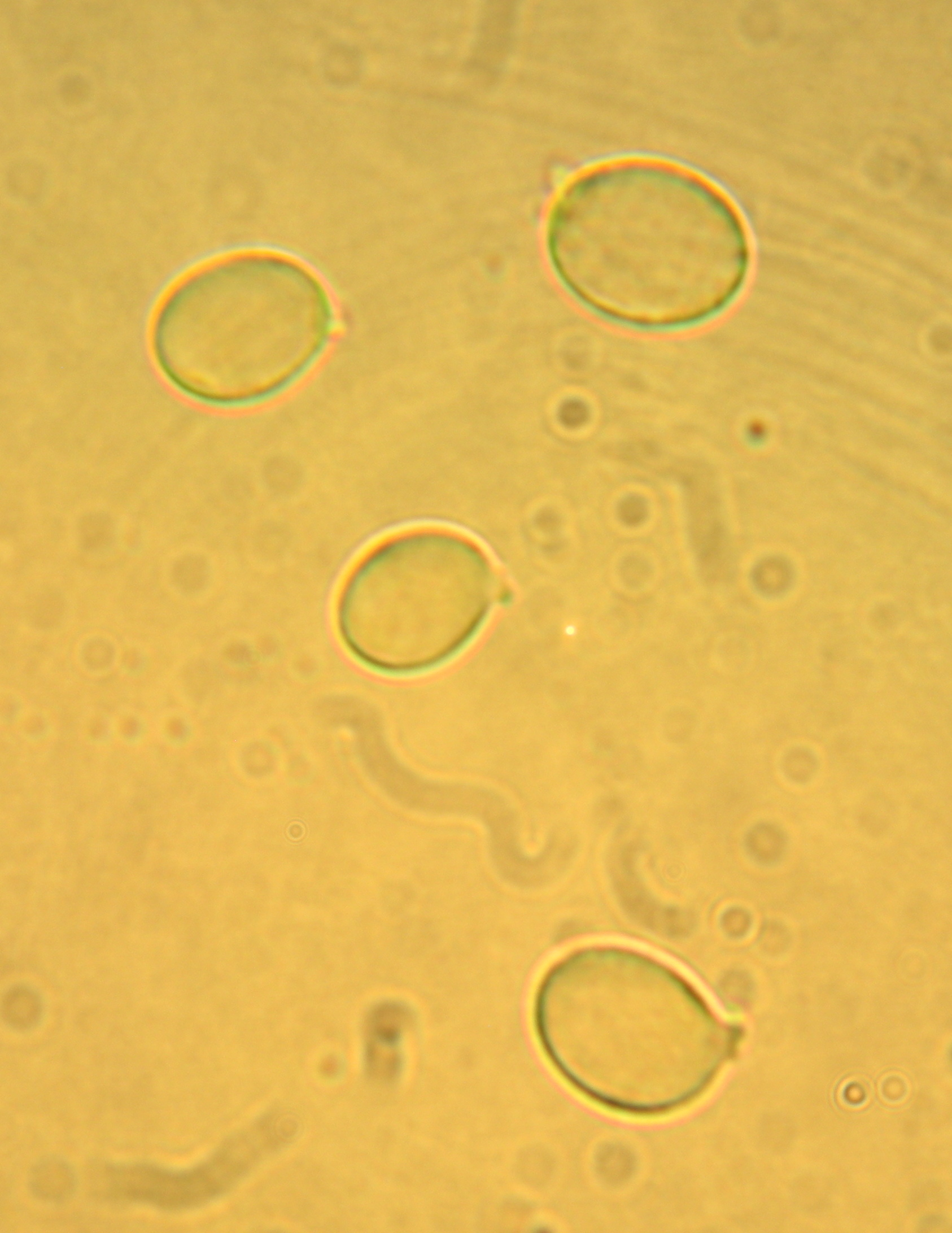
The spores are thin-walled and ellipsoid.

Amanita gemmata has ellipsoid to broadly ellipsoid spores measuring 8–10 by 6.5–7.5 μm with an average Q-ratio (the fraction of length/width) of 1.35; they are not amyloid. The spores are smooth, thin-walled, and they contain one to several small oil droplets. The basidia (spore-bearing cells of the hymenium) are usually four-spored, club shaped, and measure 30–40 by 8–11 μm.

The gill tissue is divergent, meaning that the cells are more or less parallel near the center of the gill, but bend outwards near the end of the gill. The hyphae in this tissue are cylindrical to inflated, thin walled, hyaline (translucent) to yellowish, and measure 2.2–9 μm wide; the hyphae in the central strand are narrower and typically cylindrical. The hyphae of the subhymenium (a layer of tissue directly under the hymenium) are interwoven. These hyphae are branched, cylindrical to slightly inflated, hyaline, and 6–9 μm wide. The hyphae of the cap cuticle are filamentous, interwoven, and radially arranged. They are cylindrical, 2.7–4 μm wide, thin-walled, hyaline to yellowish, and gelatinize when mounted in potassium hydroxide. The cap tissue is also interwoven, with hyphae that are cylindrical to somewhat inflated, 3.7–14.6 μm wide, thin-walled, branched, and hyaline to yellowish. Caulocystidia are abundant on the apex of the stem; they are club-shaped to cylindrical, thin-walled, hyaline, and measure 3–9 μm wide. The annulus tissue comprises interwoven cylindrical hyphae measuring 3–9 μm wide. Sphaerocysts (inflated, spherical cells) are also present in the annulus tissue; they are club shaped to ellipsoidal, with dimensions of 29–55 by 30–70 μm. The warts on the cap surface (remnants of the universal veil) comprise loosely interwoven cylindrical to inflated thin-walled hyphae that are 3.5–8 μm wide. Sphaerocysts in this tissue are 58.5–70.2 by 17.5–40 μm, ellipsoidal, and hyaline. The volval tissue is interwoven, with cylindrical, hyaline hyphae that are 4.4–7.3 μm wide. The sphaerocysts here are ellipsoidal to roughly spherical, hyaline, and measure 35–70 by 20–35 μm. In A. gemmata, where they are most abundant in the region just below the cap cuticle, these refractive cells are scattered, and have a width of 3.7–6 μm. Clamp connections are rare in the hyphae of A. gemmata; they are present in the annulus, gill tissue, subhymenium, and cap tissue.

=== Similar species ===
There are numerous species in North America that resemble A. gemmata. In 2005, mycologist Rod Tulloss described Amanita aprica, a species that has been confused with A. gemmata several times in the past. According to mycologists Pierre Neville and Serge Poumarat, the Mediterranean species A. amici (synonymous with A. gemmata f. amici) is similar in appearance to A. gemmata but is larger. According to Tulloss however, their measurements of the cap and stem dimensions of A. amici fell within the range expected for A. gemmata, and for this reason, the two taxa should be considered conspecific. Neville and Poumarat suggest that the name A. gemmata still persists for Mediterranean collections because of its frequent historical misapplication to the native Italian species A. gioiosa, which had not been described as a distinct species until 2004. A. orientigemmata, a mushroom ranging from Japan to China, is a lookalike, but has clamps, unlike A. gemmata. Other differences between the two species include the slightly smaller spores of A. orientigemmata, and differences in the microstructure of the cap warts.

It is often confused with various other European species, resembling the false death cap, tawny grisette and panther cap mushrooms. Its cap is brighter in color than the former, and more yellow than the latter two.

== Habitat and distribution ==
The fungus favours sandy and slightly acidic soils, and is often found in association with Norway Spruce (Picea abies). The mushroom grows either singly, scattered, or in groups in coniferousand mixed forests, especially along paths and roads.

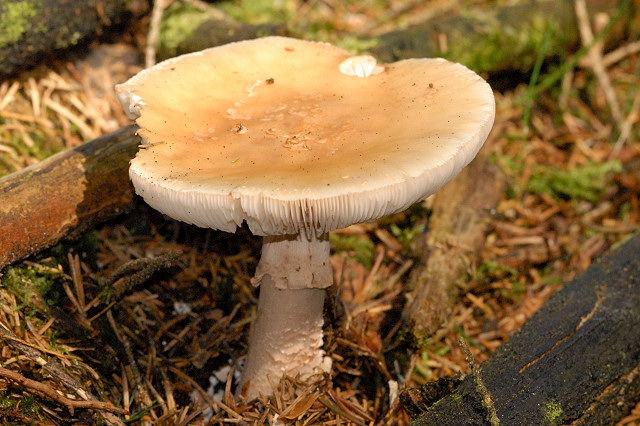
Specimen from Commanster, Belgium

The species is distributed in areas of Asia and Europe. It is widely distributed (as a species cluster) in North America, where it has been found as far south as Ixtlán de Juárez, Mexico. The species has been reported from the Dominican Republic. In South America, it is known from Chile and Colombia. In Asia, the mushroom has been collected from Iran and China.

== Ecology ==
Amanita gemmata is a mycorrhizal fungus, meaning it forms a mutually beneficial relationship with the roots of compatible host plants. Through the association, the plant provides the fungus with a carbon source, and the fungus provides the plant with several benefits such as nutrients and protection from pathogens. Largent and collaborators (1980) document mycorrhizal associations of A. gemmata with Manzanita (Arctostaphylos spp.) and Pinus contorta (lodgepole pine), and Nieto and Carbone with Pinus pinaster (maritime pine) in Spain.

== Toxicity ==
Toxicity is suspected to be due to the presence of muscimol and ibotenic acid, which is also found in many species in section Amanita of the Amanita genus, including A. muscaria and A. pantherina.

Generally, symptoms of poisoning appear within three hours of ingestion of the mushroom as visual hallucinations, nausea, vomiting, stomach pain, diarrhea, irregular and slow heart beat and agitation. Severe cases involving coma, convulsions, or death are extremely rare.

== See also ==
- List of Amanita species
