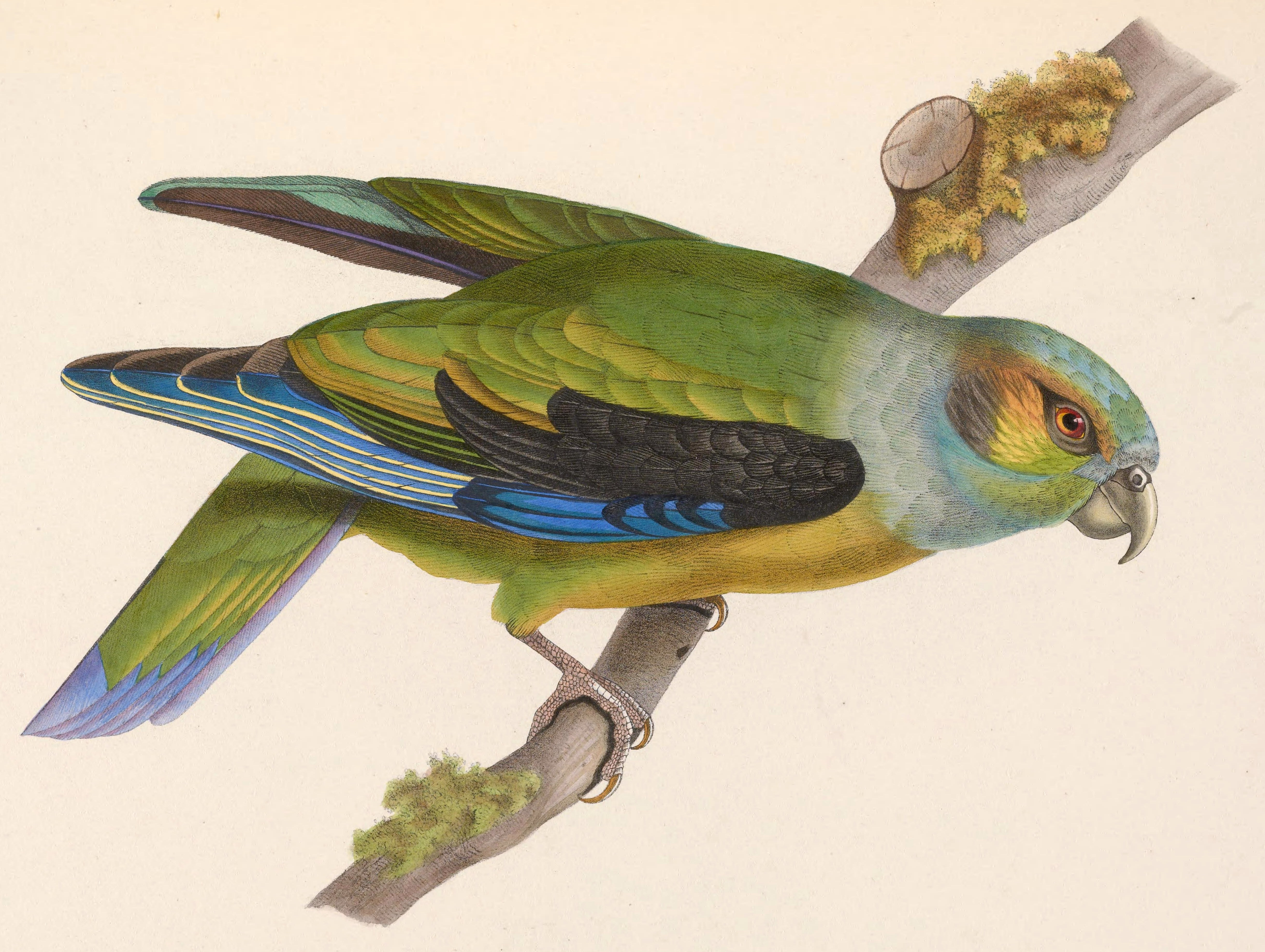

Conservation status
- Least Concern (IUCN 3.1)
- CITES Appendix II

Scientific classification
- Kingdom: Animalia
- Phylum: Chordata
- Class: Aves
- Order: Psittaciformes
- Family: Psittacidae
- Genus: Hapalopsittaca
- Species: H. melanotis

Binomial name
- Hapalopsittaca melanotis (Lafresnaye, 1847)

Synonyms
- Pionus melanotis de Lafresnaye, 1847

= Black-winged parrot =

Species of bird

The black-winged parrot (Hapalopsittaca melanotis), also known as the black-eared parrot, is a species of bird in subfamily Arinae of the family Psittacidae, the African and New World parrots. It is found in Bolivia and Peru.

== Taxonomy and systematics ==
Early in the 20th century the black-winged parrot shared genus Pionopsitta with the pileated parrot (P. pileata). It has two subspecies, the nominate H. m. melanotis (Lafresnaye, 1847) and H. m. peruviana (Carriker, 1932). There have been suggestions that peruviana deserves to be treated as a full species.

== Description ==
The black-winged parrot is about 24 cm (9.4 in) long. Adults of both subspecies are mostly green that is more yellowish on their underparts. Their crown has a blue-gray tinge, their lores are blue, and pinkish feathers surround the eye. The nominate subspecies has black ear coverts; those of H. m. peruviana are buff. The nominate has a wide blue-gray collar; that of peruviana is narrower. Both subspecies have largely black wings but for the mostly blue primaries. Their tail is green tipped, with blackish blue.

== Distribution and habitat ==
The two subspecies of the black-winged parrot have disjunct ranges. The nominate is found in central-west Bolivia between the departments of La Paz and Santa Cruz. H. m. peruviana is found in central and southern Peru, from Huánuco to Junín and Cuzco. The species inhabits humid montane evergreen forest, cloudforest, and elfin forest, even when in patches rather than continuous. In elevation it ranges between 1,740 and 3,450 m (5,700 and 11,300 ft).

== Behavior ==
=== Movement ===
The black-winged parrot's movements have not been fully defined. It may inhabit the higher elevations only seasonally, and it appears to be nomadic in search of food.

=== Feeding ===
The black-winged parrot's diet is berries, with those of Gaiadendron mistletoe being highly favored. Flocks of up to 50 have been observed moving between patches of forest in search of fruit.

=== Breeding ===
Nothing is known about the black-winged parrot's breeding biology.

=== Vocalization ===
The black-winged parrot's flight call is "a series of 1–3 short, rather mellow-sounding notes, sometimes followed by a higher-pitched more piercing note, e.g. "crrit ... crrit ... crrit .. kie"." It makes "a wider variety of short, mellow calls" when perched, and on take-off "may produce a faster and longer series of "crrit" notes."

== Status ==
The IUCN has assessed the black-winged parrot as being of Least Concern. Though it has a somewhat limited range and its population size is not known, the latter appears to be stable. No immediate threats have been identified. "Locally common, sometimes occurring in fairly large flocks, but evidently scarcer in Peru than Bolivia."
