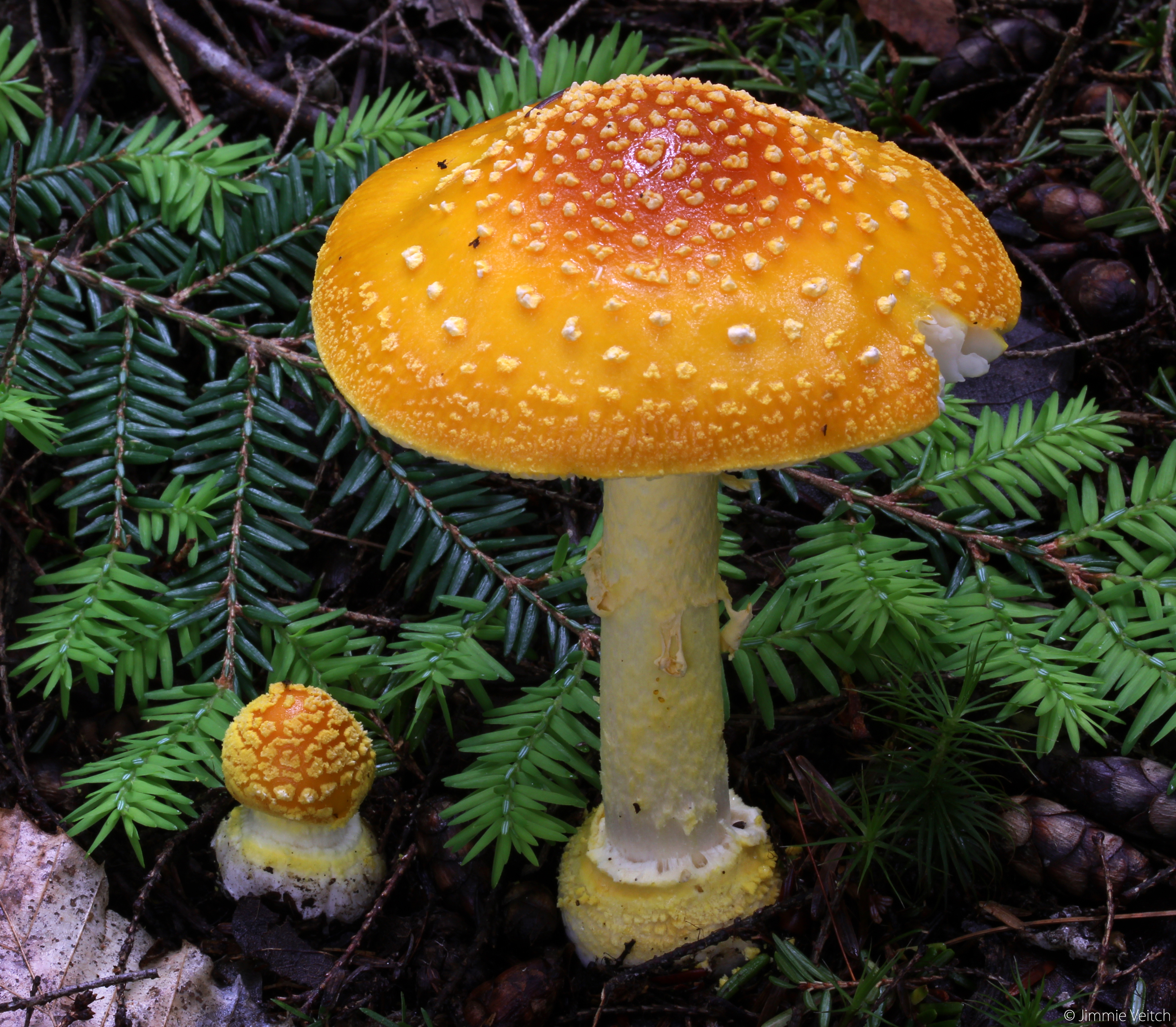

Scientific classification
- Kingdom: Fungi
- Division: Basidiomycota
- Class: Agaricomycetes
- Order: Agaricales
- Family: Amanitaceae
- Genus: Amanita
- Species: A. frostiana

Binomial name
- Amanita frostiana (Peck) Saccardo

Synonyms
- Agaricus muscarius var. minor Peck; Amanita macrospora H. L. Stewart & Grund; Amanitaria frostiana (Peck) E.-J. Gilbert

= Amanita frostiana =

Species of fungus

Amanita frostiana
- Mycological characteristics
- Gills on hymenium
- Cap is convex
- Hymenium is free
- Stipe has a ring and volva
- Spore print is white
- Ecology is mycorrhizal
- Edibility is inedible or unknown

Amanita frostiana, also known as Frost's amanita, is a small yellow-to-red fungus found in eastern North America.

== Description ==
Some of the species' notable physical characteristics, however, distinguish it from the other members of the genus. For instance, the colors of the cap, darkening over the disk, and the universal veil, colored yellow to cream. The other characteristics of the other parts of its body are as follows:

- Cap : The cap is convex or sometimes shield-shaped, becoming flat with a fairly distinctly lined margin. The cap may vary in lengths of 2–8 centimetres (1–3 inches). The colors include yellow to golden orange or a different combination of scarlet or deep reddish pink. The surface is smooth, becoming slightly sticky when moist.
- Stem/stipe : The stem, also called the stipe. The universal veil material is yellow to cream, forming yellow powder or flakes at the base of the stalk. It measures 47 to 62 millimetres (2 to 2 1/2 in) in length, and 4 to 11 mm in diameter, also consisting of a persistent annulus.
- Gills : The gills are free, close, and cream in mass. The short gills are truncate to excavated-truncate and are numerous.
- Spores and microscopic features : The spores measure 7.0 to 10.2 μm wide and are globose to subglobose and inamyloid. It has also been noticed that the spores of this mushroom do not turn black in color if iodine is poured on them.

=== Similar species ===
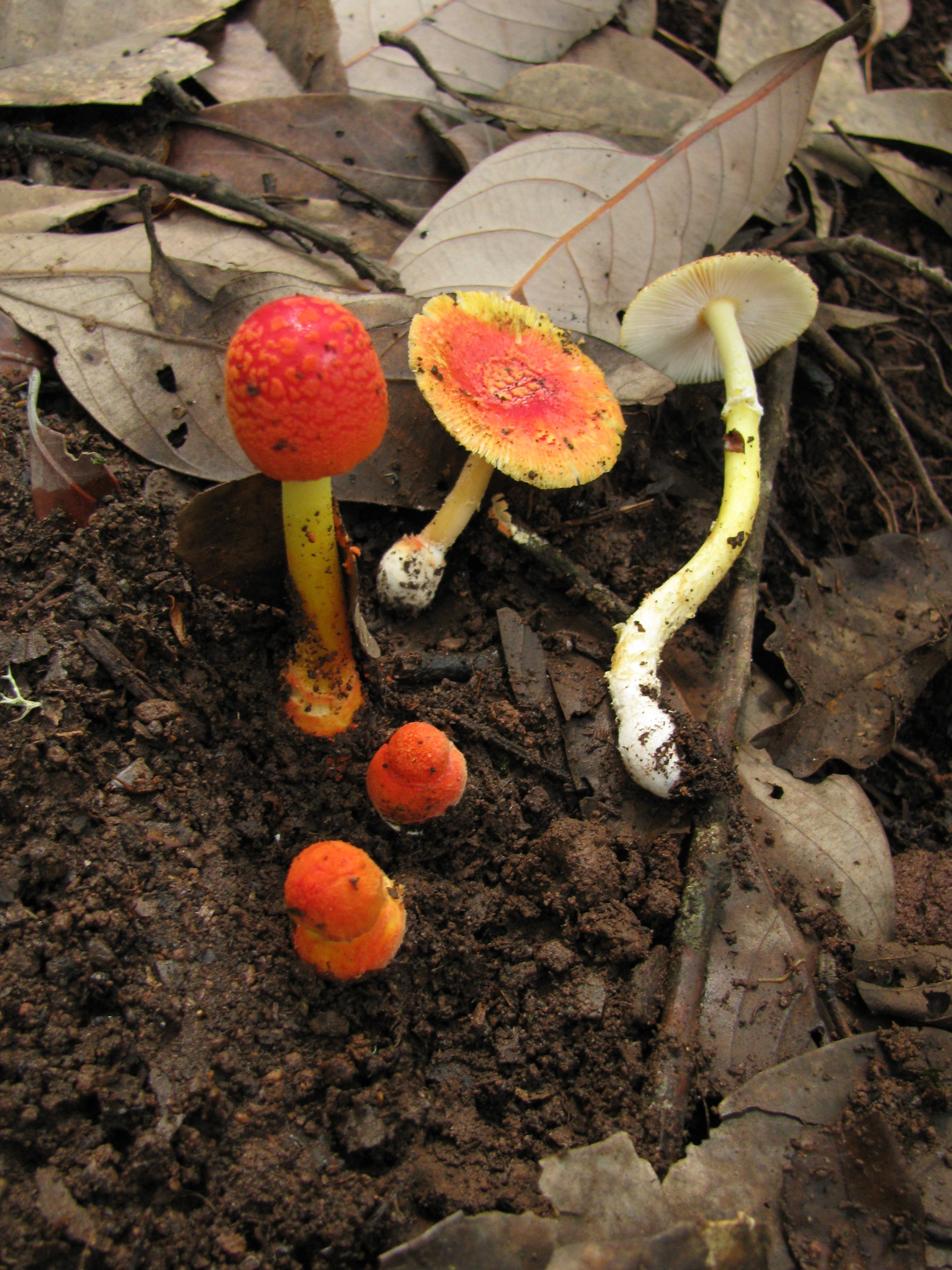
A. rubrovolvata

A. frostiana is similar to a range of species, including others in the species Amanita, like A. rubrovolvata, A. flavoconia, A. albocreata, A. muscaria var. muscaria, or simply A. muscaria.

A. rubrovolvata is slightly similar physically to this species. The fungus produces small- to medium-sized mushrooms, with reddish-orange caps. Roger Heim reported A. frostiana as occurring in Thailand, but this was probably a misidentification of A. rubrovolvata.

A. subfrostiana, also referred to as 'False Frost's Amanita', has the same natural habitat as of A. frostiana, but is mostly distributed in southwestern China. It resembles A. frostiana, but differs in the paleness of color in the caps.

The distinct and starkly white bulb (e.g., 17 x 15 mm) bears a white or yellow-white collar that is somewhat similar to the collar seen in the exannulate A. albocreata, which is a species of the hardwood-hemlock (Tsuga) forest of the northeastern U.S. and southeastern Canada and of boreal forest at least as far north as the Island of Newfoundland.

The clamps present at the bases of basidia of this species specially support the presumed relationship to A. muscaria var. muscaria or simply A. muscaria. A. muscaria is a poisonous and psychoactive basidiomycete fungus, one of many in the genus.

Many misidentifications have taken place while recognizing A. flavoconia, one of the most common and widespread species of Amanita in eastern North America, due to various similar physical characteristics. It is mostly confused due to its microscopic features.

== Distribution and habitat ==
This rare species is considered native to the eastern U.S. and southeastern Canada. It is normally found in mixed forests with oaks (mostly Quercus oaks) and conifers (mostly Pinaceae conifers).

== Edibility ==
This species is of unknown edibility and may be poisonous.

== See also ==
- List of Amanita species
