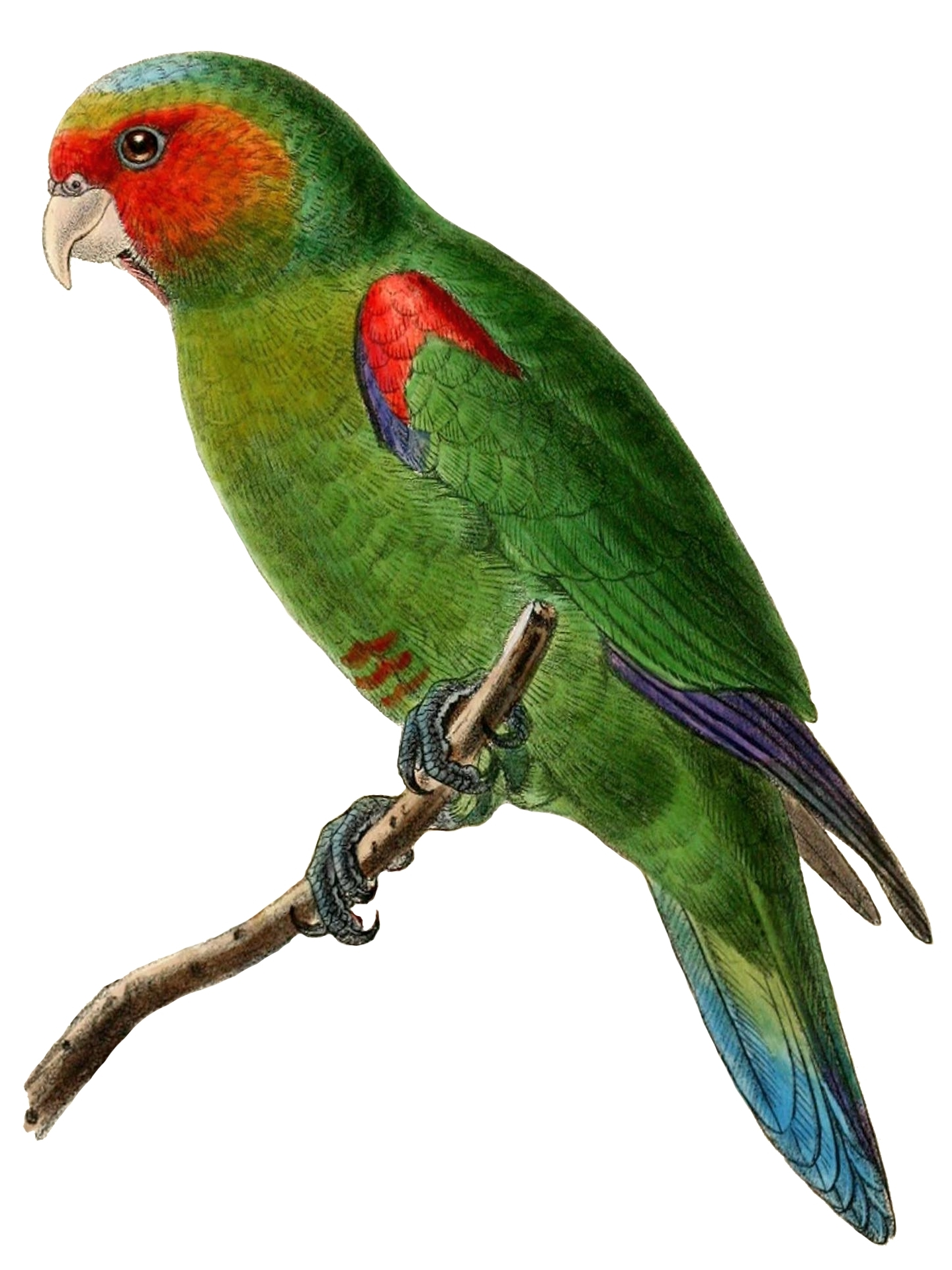
- Red-faced parrot (Hapalopsittaca pyrrhops)

Scientific classification
- Kingdom: Animalia
- Phylum: Chordata
- Class: Aves
- Order: Psittaciformes
- Family: Psittacidae
- Subfamily: Arinae
- Genus: Hapalopsittaca; Ridgway, 1912

Type species
- Psittacus amazoninus Des Murs, 1845

Species
- see text

= Hapalopsittaca =

Genus of birds

Hapalopsittaca is a genus of Neotropical parrot native to the Andes of South America.

== Species ==
It contains the following species:

Image	Scientific name	Common name	Distribution
	Hapalopsittaca amazonina	Rusty-faced parrot	Colombia and Venezuela
	Hapalopsittaca pyrrhops	Red-faced parrot	Ecuador and Peru.
	Hapalopsittaca fuertesi	Fuertes's parrot	Central Andes of Colombia.
	Hapalopsittaca melanotis	Black-winged parrot	Peru

The rusty-faced parrot, red-faced parrot and Fuertes's parrot form a superspecies complex, and have at various times been considered conspecific.
