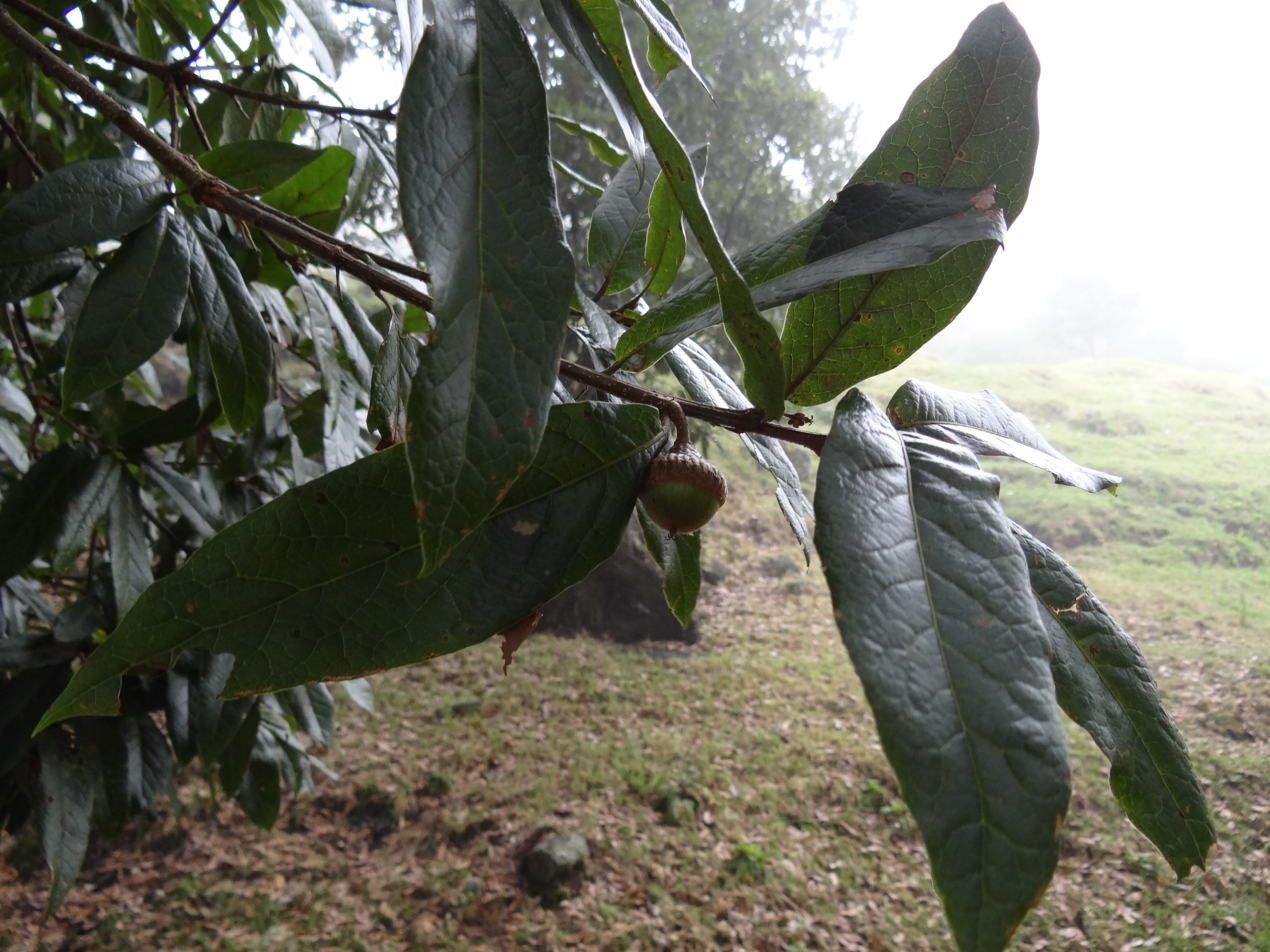

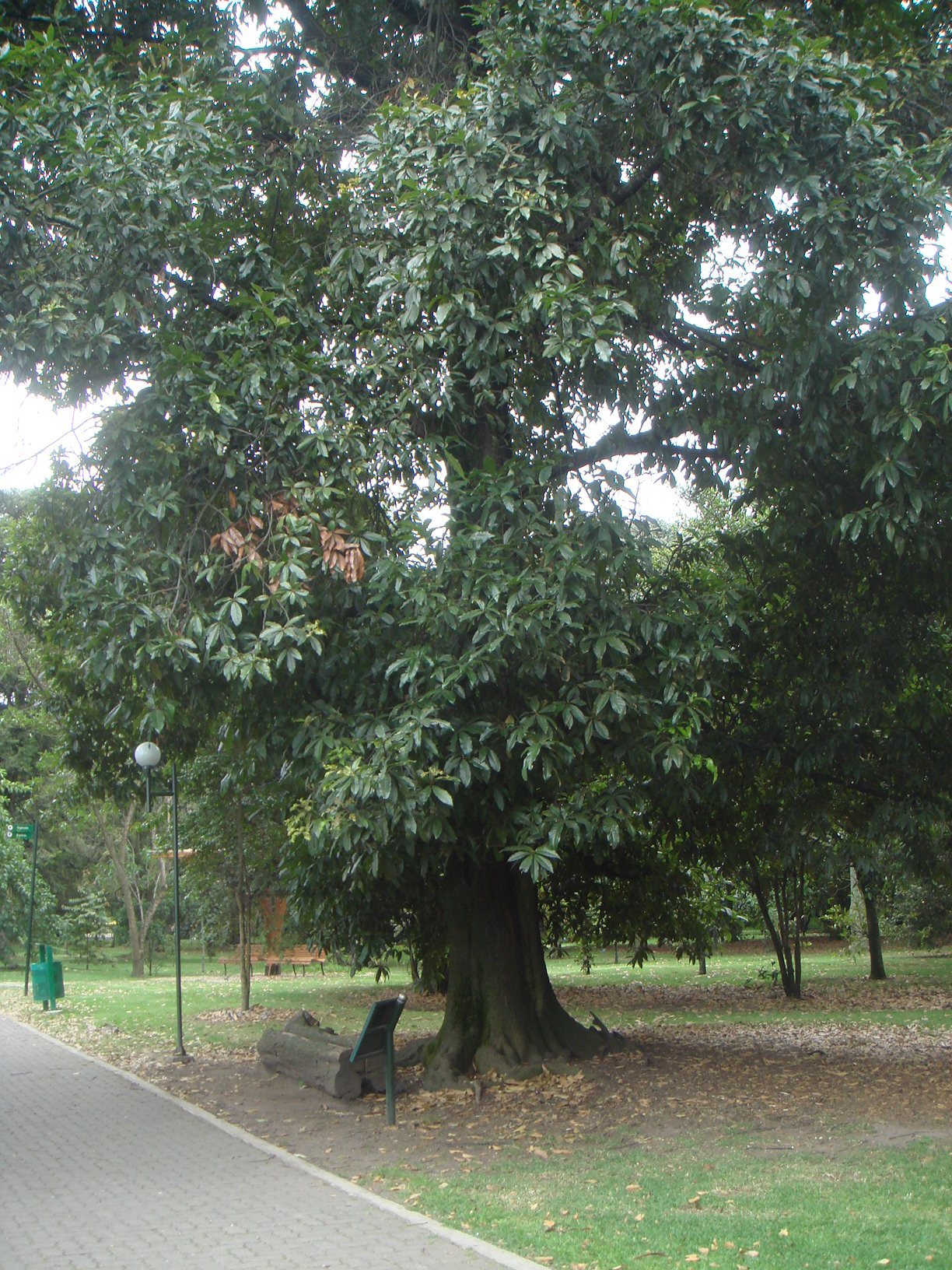

Conservation status
- Least Concern (IUCN 3.1)

Scientific classification
- Kingdom: Plantae
- Clade: Embryophytes
- Clade: Tracheophytes
- Clade: Spermatophytes
- Clade: Angiosperms
- Clade: Eudicots
- Clade: Rosids
- Order: Fagales
- Family: Fagaceae
- Genus: Quercus
- Subgenus: Quercus subg. Quercus
- Section: Quercus sect. Lobatae
- Species: Q. humboldtii

Binomial name
- Quercus humboldtii Bonpl.

Synonyms
- List: Erythrobalanus humboldtii (Bonpl.) O.Schwarz; Erythrobalanus lindenii (A.DC.) O.Schwarz; Erythrobalanus tolimensis (Bonpl.) O.Schwarz; Quercus almaguerensis Bonpl.; Quercus humboldtii Kotschy ex A.DC.; Quercus humboldtii var. lehmanniana Hieron. ex Trel.; Quercus lindenii A.DC.; Quercus tolimensis Bonpl.

= Quercus humboldtii =

Species of tree

Quercus humboldtii, commonly known as the Andean oak, Colombian oak or roble, is a species of oak found only in Colombia and Panama. It is named for Alexander von Humboldt.

== Description ==
Quercus humboldtii is an evergreen tree which grows to a height of 25 metres (82 feet) and a diameter of 1 m (3 ft 3 in), with buttresses of up to 1 m. Its bark is reddish gray or gray and fissured, breaking into squares and flaking. The leaves are simple, alternate and lanceolate, up to 10–20 centimetres (4–8 inches) long, and clustered at the ends of the branches. The flowers are small, yellow, and unisexual, with a racemic inflorescence. Male flowers are numerous, with long-styled female flowers in a cupula. The fruit is a light brown, ovoid capsule, or acorn, with a leathery pericarp, 20–25 millimetres (3/4–1 inch) in diameter and 50–70 mm (2–2 3/4 in) long, resting on a scaly cupule. Only one fruit per cupule is developed, and the inside of the acorn shell is woolly.

== Distribution and habitat ==
It grows in the mountains with an elevational range from 1,000 to 3,200 m (3,300 to 10,500 ft). It is found on all three Colombian Andean mountain ranges and some lowland inter-Andean regions, and in the Serranía del Darién on the border between Panama and Colombia.

The tree grows in the Andean highlands where the mean annual temperature is 16−24 °C, and the mean annual rainfall 1,500–2,500 mm (59–98 in). It can be found in moderately fertile and deep soils as well as in degraded soils, preferring shallow soils with a thick layer of humus. The acorns provide important food for wildlife; two parrots – the rusty-faced parrot and Fuertes's parrot – are endemic to the threatened montane ecosystems of the Colombian Andes and are particularly dependent on the Andean oak forests as a home.
