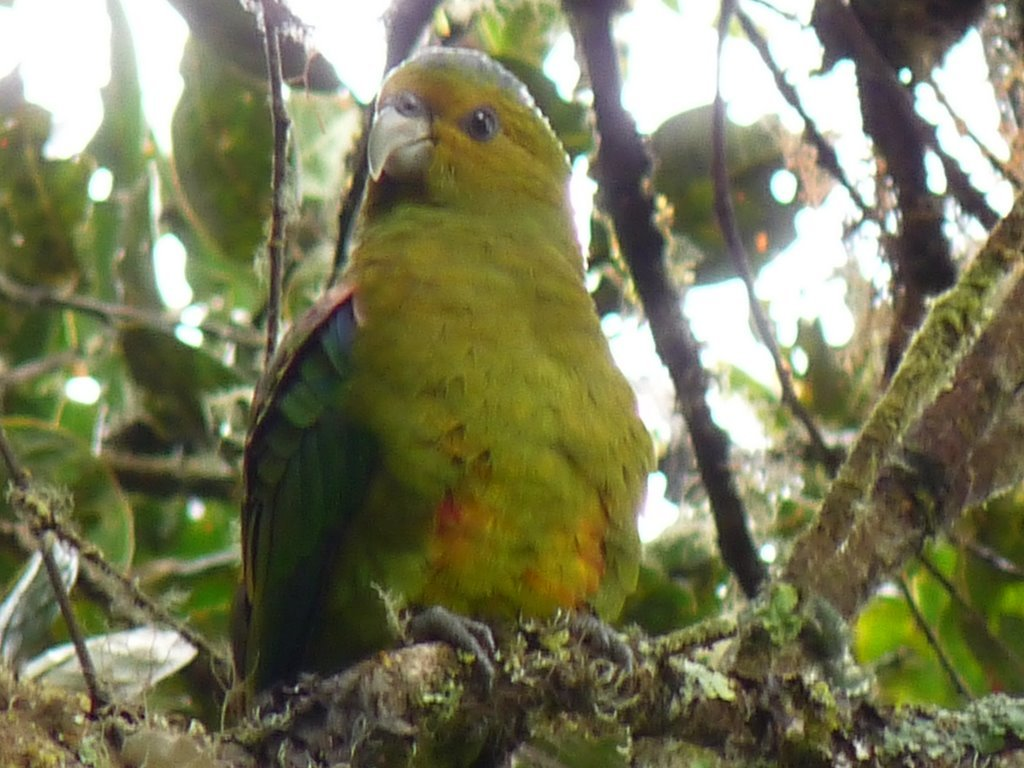
- a Fuerte's parrot seen in Tolima in 2009

Conservation status
- Endangered (IUCN 3.1)
- CITES Appendix II

Scientific classification
- Kingdom: Animalia
- Phylum: Chordata
- Class: Aves
- Order: Psittaciformes
- Family: Psittacidae
- Genus: Hapalopsittaca
- Species: H. fuertesi

Binomial name
- Hapalopsittaca fuertesi (Chapman, 1912)

= Fuertes's parrot =

Species of bird

Fuertes's parrot (Hapalopsittaca fuertesi), also known as the indigo-winged parrot, is an Endangered species of bird in subfamily Arinae of the family Psittacidae, the African and New World parrots. It is endemic to Colombia.

== Taxonomy and systematics ==
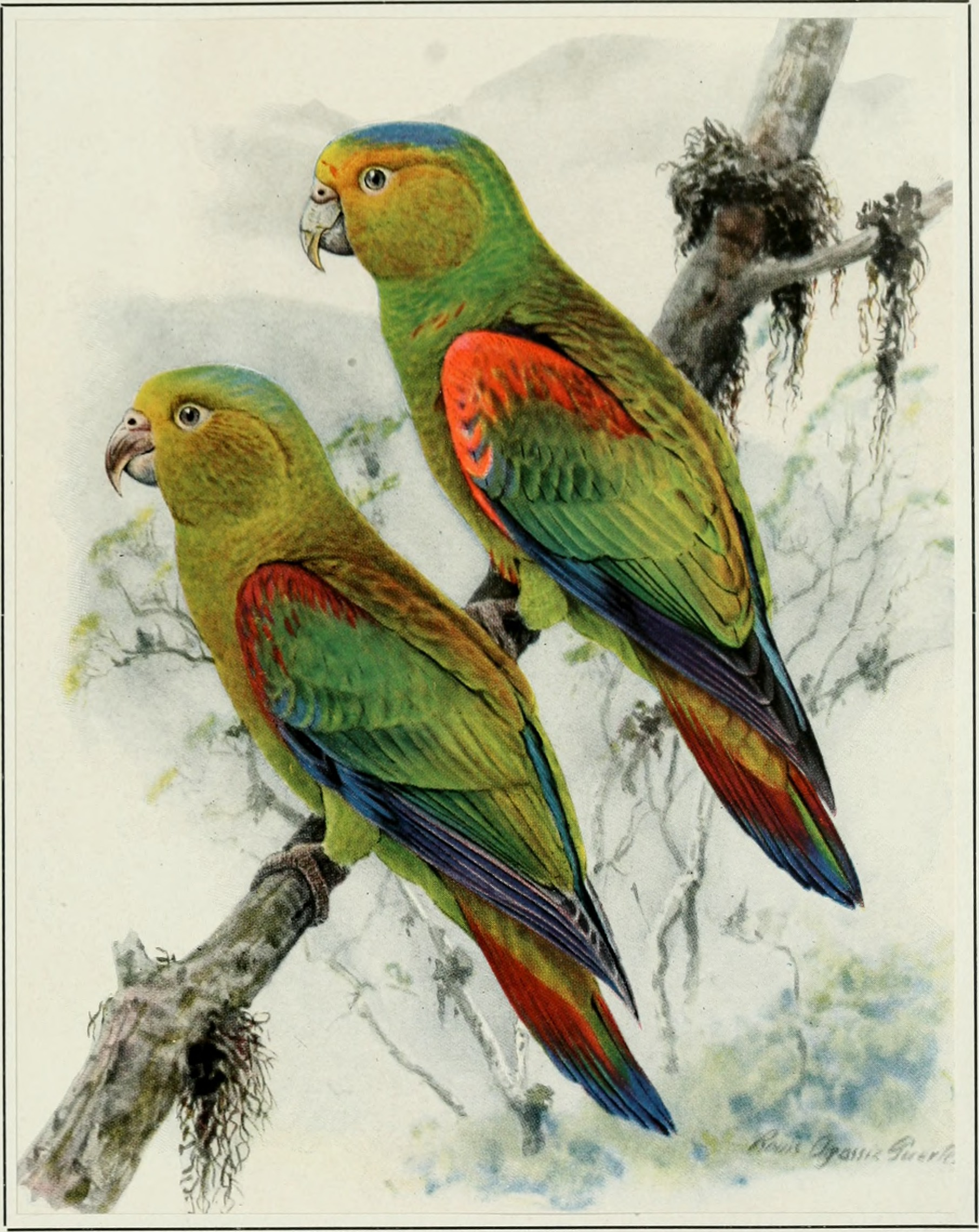
Plate from the American Museum Journal article on the discovery of the species by Chapman in Cauca, Colombia

What is now Fuerte's parrot was at one time considered a subspecies of the rusty-faced parrot (H. amazonina). The two of them and the red-faced parrot (H. pyrrhops) form a superspecies. Fuerte's parrot is monotypic.

The species' English name and specific epithet honor Louis Agassiz Fuertes, "one of the 'greats' of American bird art".

== Description ==
Fuertes's parrot is about 23 to 24 cm (9.1 to 9.4 in) long and weighs about 124 g (4.4 oz). Adults have a thin red band just above the bill, an olive-yellow forecrown and face, a blue crown, and a green hindneck. Their upperparts are green with pale fringes on the mantle feathers. Their throat and breast are green with a golden-olive tinge and their belly, thighs, and undertail coverts are yellowish green; their belly has variable amounts of dull red. The bend of their wing and its leading edge are red, the median and greater coverts dark violet-blue, their primaries black with purplish blue edges, and their secondaries are mostly blue with some green edges. Their underwing coverts are crimson and the rest of their wing's underside is greenish blue. Their tail is blue with red on the inner webs of the central feathers; the tail is duller below than above. Their bill is horn-colored with a darker base to the mandible, their eyes yellowish, and their legs and feet dark gray.

== Distribution and habitat ==
Fuertes's parrot is found only on the west slope of Colombia's Central Andes in the departments of Quindío and Risaralda. There were no records of the species between 1992 and 2002. Following its "rediscovery" two Natural Reserves were established, Alto Quindío Acaime and Cañón del Quindío. More recently two other reserves have been established in its core habitat, Loro Coroniazul and Giles-Fuertesi Bird Reserves. Fuertes's parrot inhabits wet temperate cloudforest characterized by many epiphytes and oaks (Quercus). Most of the records are between elevations of 2,900 and 3,150 m (9,500 and 10,300 ft) though some have been as low as 2,160 m (7,100 ft) and as high as 3,500 m (11,500 ft).

== Behavior ==
=== Movement ===
The movements, if any, of Fuertes's parrot are not known, but elevational movements are probable.

=== Feeding ===
Fuertes's parrot typically feeds in flocks of up to about 15 individuals. Its diet is fruit and that of Antidaphne viscoidea is especially favored.

=== Breeding ===
Extensive studies of the breeding biology of Fuertes's parrot have been conducted in concert with efforts to increase the species' population. Most of the preserves provide nest boxes that are closely monitored. The species nests between January and May, using both the nest boxes and natural cavities in trees. The clutch size is three or four eggs. The female alone incubates them, for about 24 to 27 days. Both parents care for the young after hatching; fledging occurs 55 to 65 days after hatch.

=== Vocalization ===
The flight call of Fuertes's parrot is "a rather nasal, grating "krraa" "; it makes a similar call when perched.

== Status ==
The IUCN assessed Fuertes's parrot as Critically Endangered until 2021, when it was reclassified as Endangered. The species' population had been in decline until the nest box program reversed that trend. Though its estimated population is only 230 to 300 mature individuals, it is increasing. About 50% of its original habitat has been cleared and deforestation continues outside the refuges, though at a slower pace than in the past. The pet trade has apparently not had a major impact on the species.
