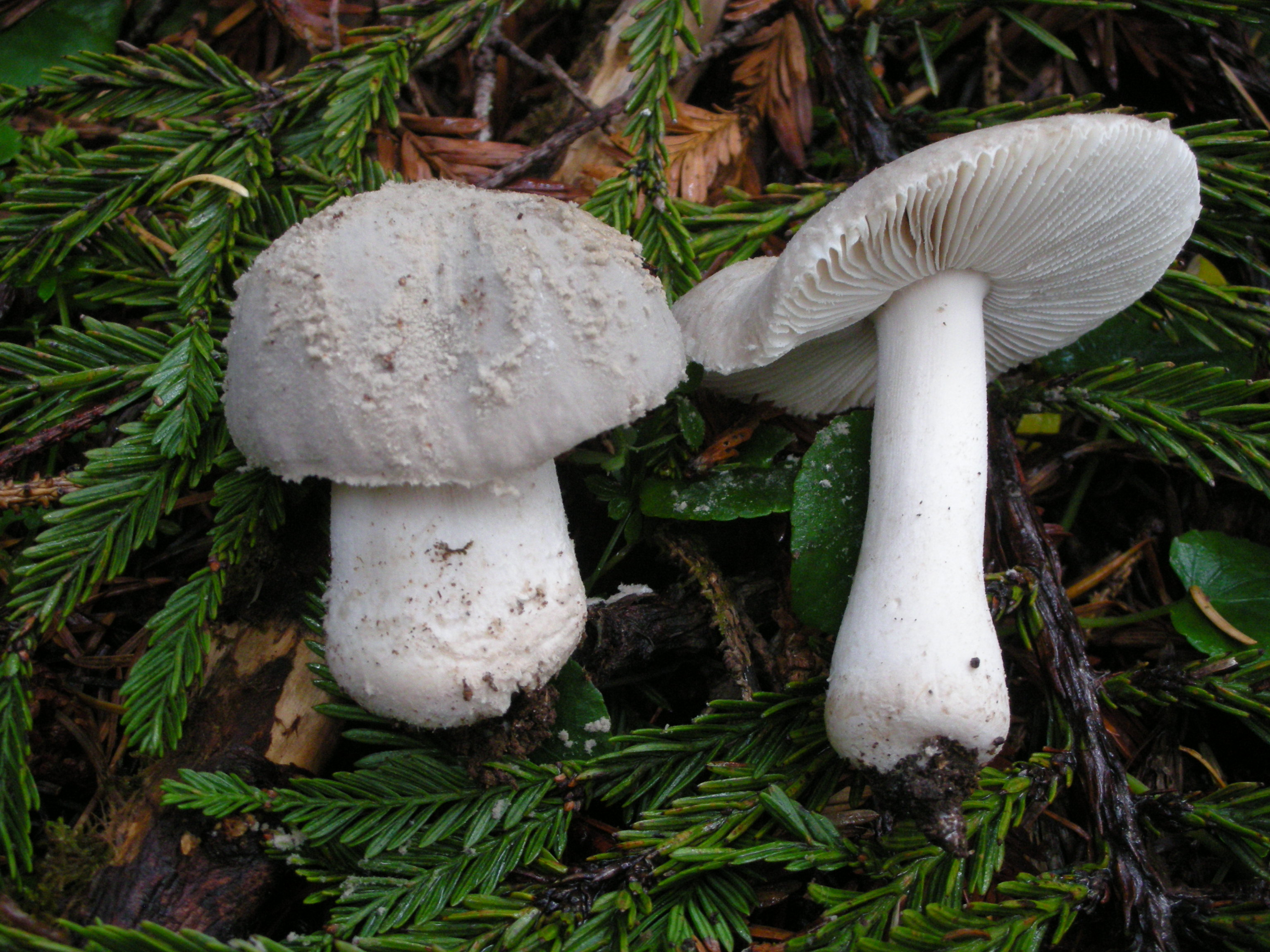

Conservation status
- Vulnerable (NatureServe)

Scientific classification
- Kingdom: Fungi
- Division: Basidiomycota
- Class: Agaricomycetes
- Order: Agaricales
- Family: Amanitaceae
- Genus: Amanita
- Species: A. farinosa

Binomial name
- Amanita farinosa (Schw.)

= Amanita farinosa =

Species of fungus

Amanita farinosa
- Mycological characteristics
- Gills on hymenium
- Cap is flat or convex
- Hymenium is free
- Stipe is bare
- Spore print is white
- Ecology is mycorrhizal
- Edibility is poisonous

Amanita farinosa, commonly known as the floury amanita, eastern American floury amanita or the American floury amanita, is a North American poisonous mushroom of the genus Amanita, a genus of fungi including some of the most deadly mushrooms.

== Taxonomy ==
Two recent molecular studies show that A. farinosa is part of a subgroup within Amanita with its close relatives A. muscaria, A. gemmata, and A. roseotincta.

== Description ==
The cap is 2.5–7 centimetres (1–3 inches) in diameter, domed in young and flat in older specimens, with a striate margin. It is whitish grey and covered with brownish grey volval or mealy material. The gills are white. They may be attached to the stem or free. They are close and crowded and not bruising. The stem, or the stipe, lacks a ring and at its base a smallish bulb or volva. It measures up to 6.5 cm high and 1–3 cm thick. The stem is white to tan in color. The spores are white. They are 5.5–8 x 6–8 μm in measurement and inamyloid. The spores are smooth and round to broadly elliptical. The flesh is white in color. It does not stain on exposure. In old specimens, the smell can be strong and that of mink.

The poisonous mushroom resembles some other members of its genus.

== Distribution and habitat ==
An uncommon mushroom, it is found in eastern North America from summer to autumn among the underwood of hardwood trees.

== See also ==
- List of Amanita species
