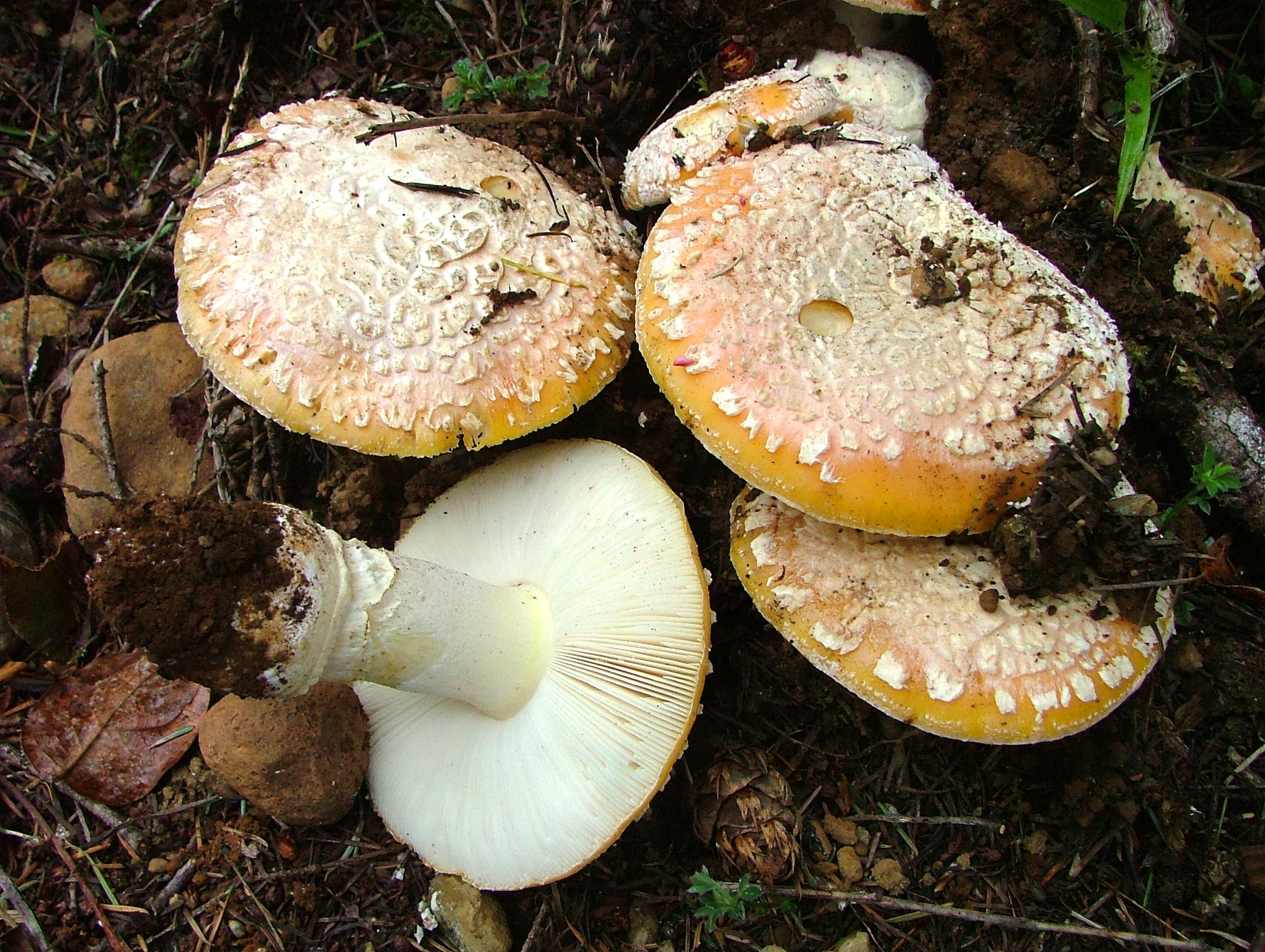

Conservation status
- Least Concern (IUCN 3.1)

Scientific classification
- Kingdom: Fungi
- Division: Basidiomycota
- Class: Agaricomycetes
- Order: Agaricales
- Family: Amanitaceae
- Genus: Amanita
- Species: A. aprica

Binomial name
- Amanita aprica J.Lindgr. & Tulloss (2005)

= Amanita aprica =

Species of fungus

Amanita aprica Mycological characteristics
- Gills on hymenium
- Cap is flat or convex
- Hymenium is free
- Stipe has a ring and volva
- Spore print is white
- Ecology is mycorrhizal
- Edibility is poisonous

Amanita aprica, also known as the sunshine amanita, is a toxic species of fungus in the family Amanitaceae.

The species has a yellow to orange cap with warty remnants of the whitish universal veil. The gills are pale, as is the stipe, which may be wider at the base. A skirt-like ring may be present, especially on younger specimens.

Described as new to science in 2005, the species is found in the Pacific Northwest region of North America, where it grows in a mycorrhizal association with Douglas-fir and pines.

== See also ==
- List of Amanita species
