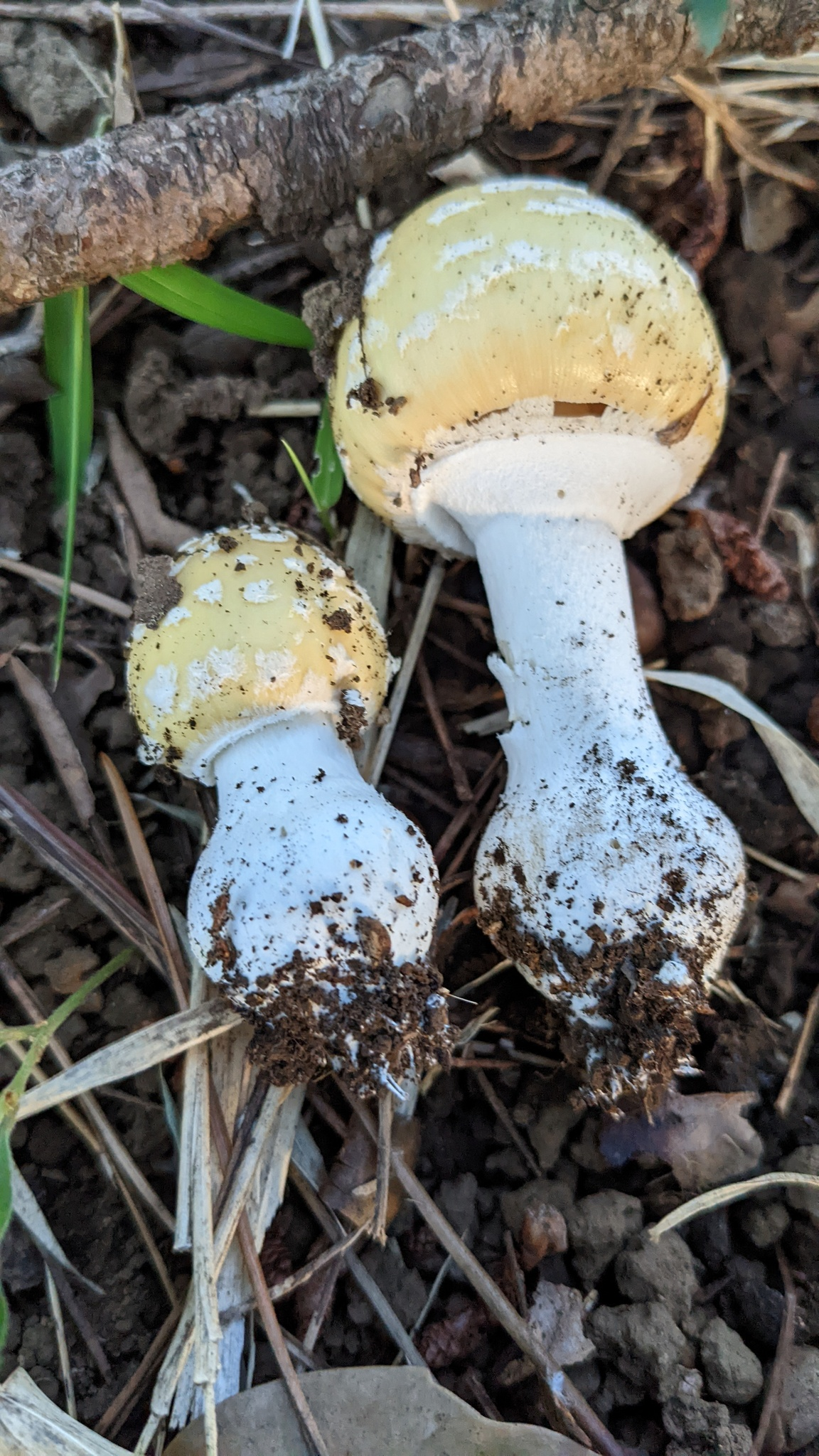

Scientific classification
- Kingdom: Fungi
- Division: Basidiomycota
- Class: Agaricomycetes
- Order: Agaricales
- Family: Amanitaceae
- Genus: Amanita
- Species: A. orientigemmata

Binomial name
- Amanita orientigemmata Zhu L. Yang & Yoshim. Doi, 1999

= Amanita orientigemmata =

Species of fungus

Amanita orientigemmata, is a species of agaric fungus in the family Amanitaceae native to northeastern, northwestern and southern China, India and Japan, first described by Zhu L. Yang & Yoshimichi Doi in 1999.

== Description ==
It is characterized by its yellowish to yellow pileus with white or dirty-white volval remnants that are felted to patchy, sometimes pyramidal. Its annulus is fragile and fugacious; sometimes volval remnants remain on the stipe base. Basidiospores are broadly ellipsoid, clamps exist as well. It has been involved in at least one non-lethal case of psycho-neurological poisoning in China.
