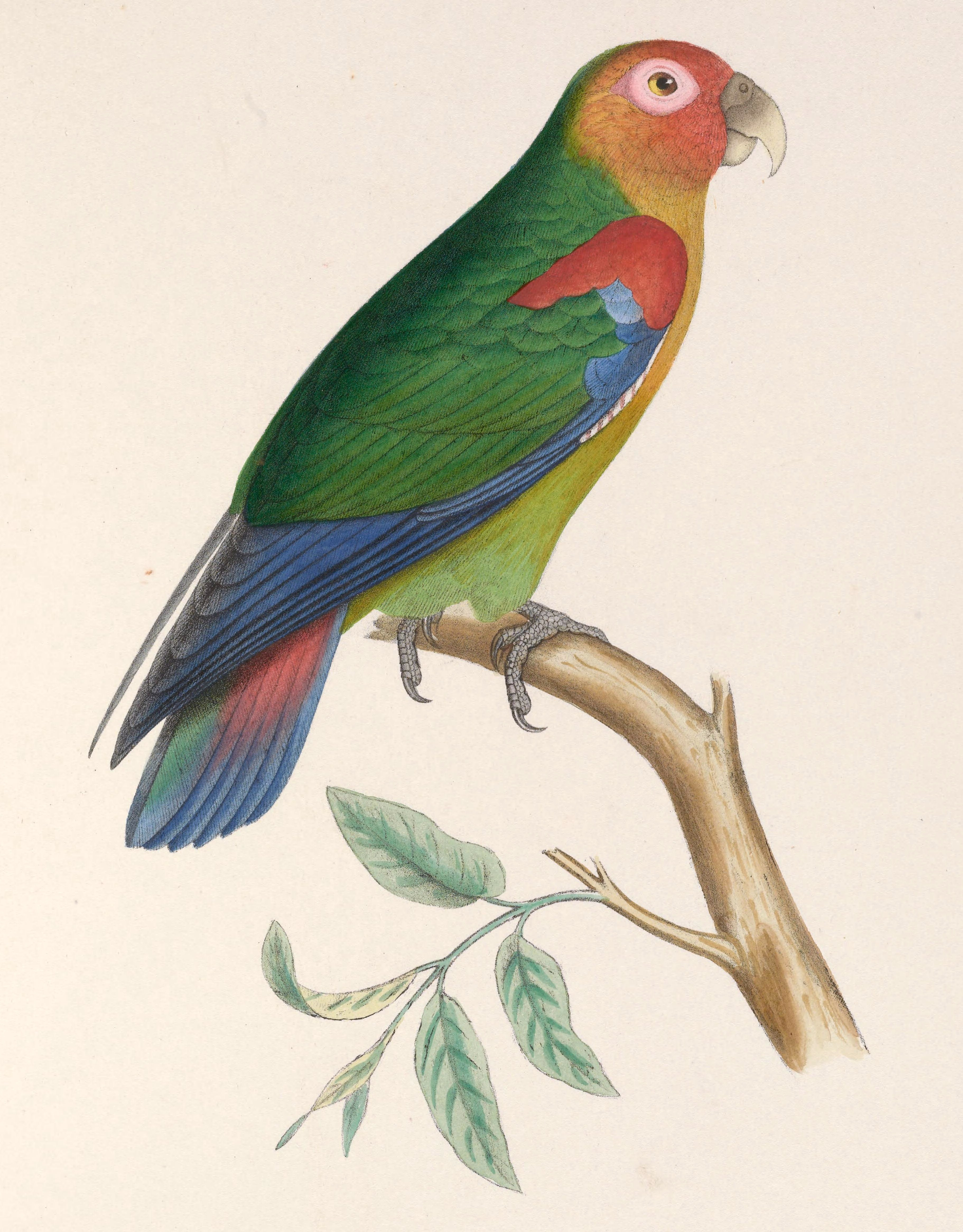

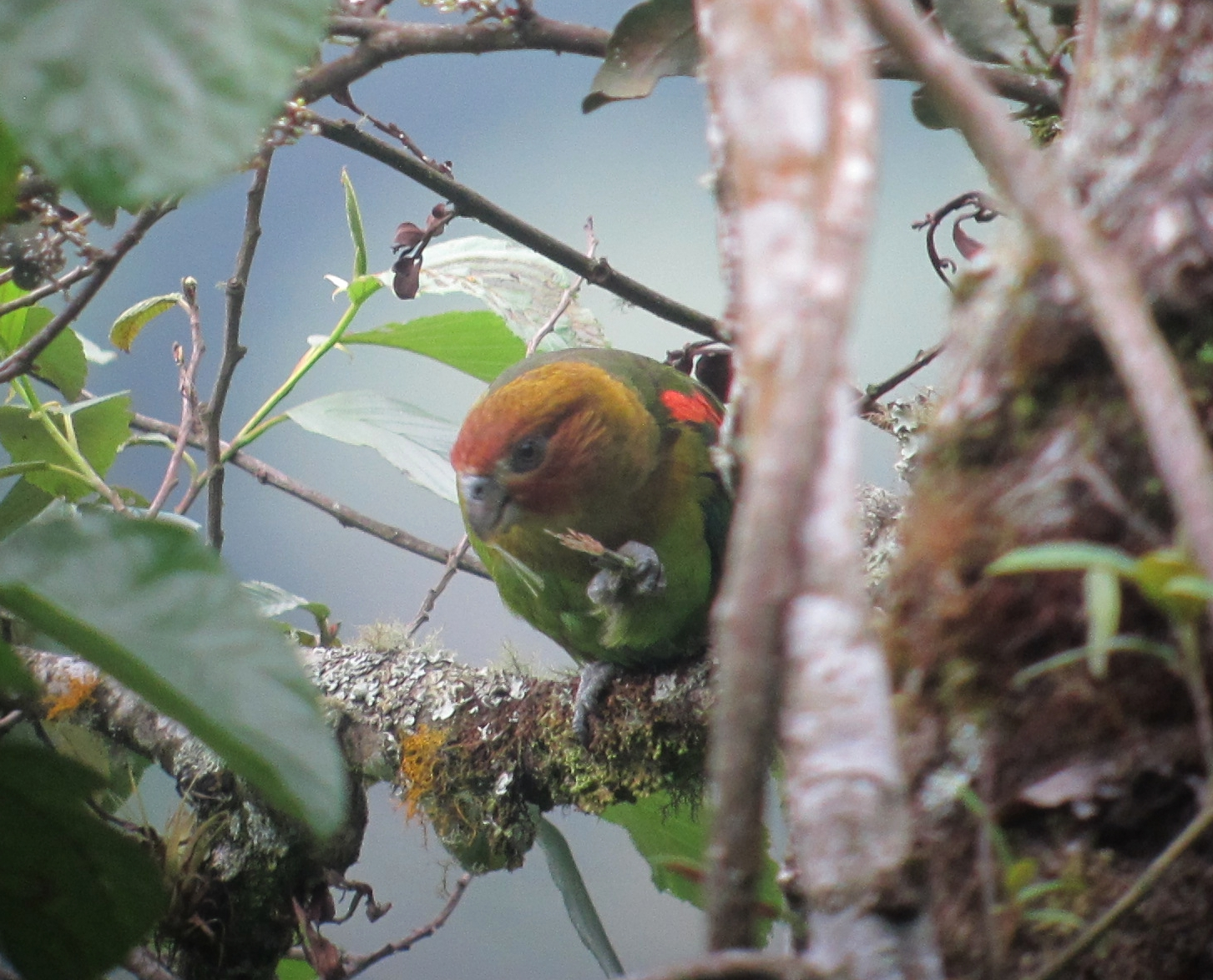

Conservation status
- Near Threatened (IUCN 3.1)
- CITES Appendix II

Scientific classification
- Kingdom: Animalia
- Phylum: Chordata
- Class: Aves
- Order: Psittaciformes
- Family: Psittacidae
- Genus: Hapalopsittaca
- Species: H. amazonina

Binomial name
- Hapalopsittaca amazonina (Des Murs, 1845)

= Rusty-faced parrot =

Species of bird

The rusty-faced parrot (Hapalopsittaca amazonina) is a Near Threatened species of bird in subfamily Arinae of the family Psittacidae, the African and New World parrots. It is found in Colombia and Venezuela and possibly Ecuador.

== Taxonomy and systematics ==
The rusty-faced parrot has these three subspecies:

- H. a. theresae (Hellmayr, 1915)
- H. a. velezi Graves, GR & Restrepo, 1989
- H. a. amazonina (Des Murs, 1845)

What are now Fuertes's parrot (H. fuertesi) and the red-faced parrot (H. pyrrhops) were previously treated as subspecies of the rusty-faced parrot. The three now make a superspecies.

== Description ==
The rusty-faced parrot is about 23 cm (9.1 in) long and weighs 97 to 115 g (3.4 to 4.1 oz). Adults of the nominate subspecies H. a. amazonina have a dull orange-red forehead and crown, yellow lores, an orange-red chin, and brownish red ear coverts with yellow streaks. Their upperparts are green with a red shoulder. Their breast is buffy olive and the rest of their underparts grass green. Their primaries and secondary coverts are blue, the former darker than the latter. Their tail is dark red with blue-black to violet blue tips. Immature birds have a duller red face with fewer yellow streaks than adults. Subspecies H. a. theresae has darker green upperparts than the nominate, and the red on their face is more brownish, their ear coverts darker, and their breast rusty olive. H. a. velezi is like the nominate with the addition of a golden olive hindneck and nape.

== Distribution and habitat ==
The subspecies of the rusty-faced parrot are found thus:

- H. a. theresae, northwestern Venezuela from central Trujillo to northern Táchira
- H. a. velezi, Colombia's Western and Central Andes and possibly extreme northern Ecuador
- H. a. amazonina, Colombia's Eastern Andes and extreme western Venezuela

Undocumented sight records in Ecuador lead the South American Classification Committee of the American Ornithological Society to classify the species as hypothetical in that country.

The rusty-faced parrot mostly inhabits very wet cloudforest, though H. a. velezi has been recorded where the alder Alnus acuminata has been used for reforestation. In elevation it mostly ranges between 2,500 and 3,000 m (8,200 and 9,800 ft) but has been recorded as low as 1,500 m (4,900 ft) and as high as 3,500 m (11,500 ft).

== Behavior ==
=== Movement ===
Only small elevational movements are known for the rusty-faced parrot.

=== Feeding ===
The rusty-faced parrot feeds on seeds and fruit including those of genus Clusia and mistletoes.

=== Breeding ===
Nothing is known about the rusty-faced parrot's breeding biology.

=== Vocalization ===
The rusty-faced parrot's flight call is "a repeated strident and loud "creek!"." It also makes " similar piercing calls such as "creenk!" or a more bisyllabic "shreeank" " when perched.

== Status ==
The IUCN originally assessed the rusty-faced parrot as Threatened, then in 1994 as Endangered, in 2005 as Vulnerable, and since 2021 as Near Threatened. It has a limited range and its estimated population of below 10,000 mature individuals is believed to be decreasing. The primary threat is deforestation for human settlement expansion, agriculture, ranching, and other purposes. The species is considered rare throughout its range; much of its original habitat has already been cleared or degraded. Though it occurs in two Venezuelan national parks, they are threatened by human encroachment.
