= Amanita viscidolutea =

Conservation status
- Vulnerable (IUCN 3.1)

Scientific classification
- Domain: Eukaryota
- Kingdom: Fungi
- Division: Basidiomycota
- Class: Agaricomycetes
- Order: Agaricales
- Family: Amanitaceae
- Genus: Amanita
- Species: A. viscidolutea

Binomial name
- Amanita viscidolutea Menolli, Capelari & Baseia, 2009

Species of fungus

Amanita viscidolutea is a species of agaric fungus in the family Amanitaceae native to Brazil.

== Taxonomy ==
The species was first described by Menolli, Capelari & Baseia in 2009.

== Description ==
Amanita viscidolutea has a yellow pileus of 4–6 centimetres (1 1/2–2 1/2 inches) in diameter, plane to depressed, with distinct striate white margin and yellowish-white patches of universal veil at center. Lamellae are free, yellowish-white, truncate to rounded-truncate. The stipe is 8–12 cm (3–4 1/2 in) tall and about 38 millimetres (1 1/2 in) wide, yellowish-white and exannulate, with bulb-shaped remnants of universal veil encircling stipe base. It has a pleasant aroma. Basidiospores are inamyloid.

== Distribution and habitat ==
Native to Brazil, this species is solitary to subgregarious, and grows in sandy soil. It is associated and thus possibly in mycorrhizal symbiosis with Coccoloba and Guapira species.

== Conservation ==
It is listed as a vulnerable species on IUCN Red List. Given its habitat, it is threatened by deforestation.
