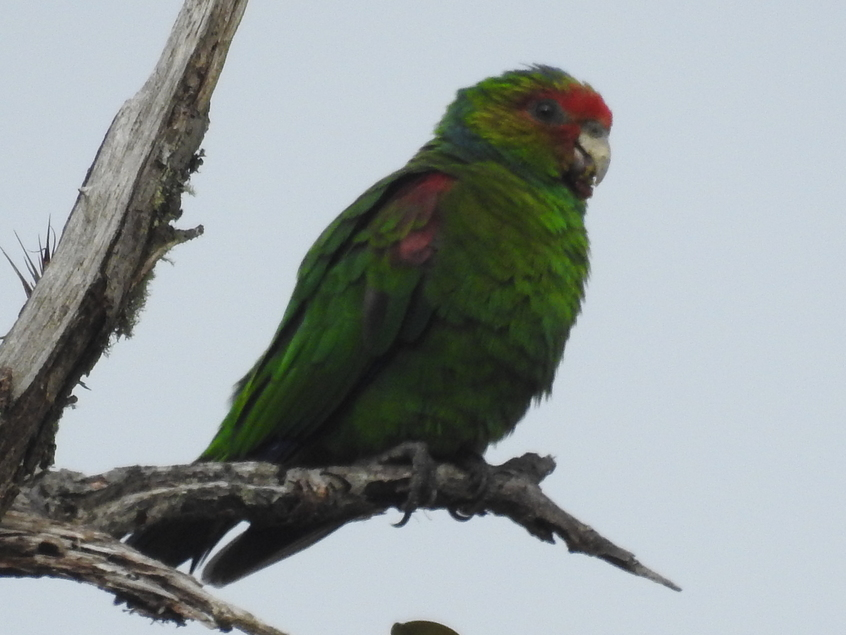

Conservation status
- Endangered (IUCN 3.1)

Scientific classification
- Kingdom: Animalia
- Phylum: Chordata
- Class: Aves
- Order: Psittaciformes
- Family: Psittacidae
- Genus: Hapalopsittaca
- Species: H. pyrrhops

Binomial name
- Hapalopsittaca pyrrhops (Salvin, 1876)

= Red-faced parrot =

Species of bird

The red-faced parrot (Hapalopsittaca pyrrhops) is a species of parrot in the family Psittacidae.

== Taxonomy ==
The parrot is monotypic. Historically, it was treated as a subspecies of the rusty-faced parrot (Hapalopsittaca amazonia). However, a 1989 study by Graves & Uribe Restrepo found substantial evidence to regard it as a full species.

== Habitat ==
Currently, the red-faced parrot has only been found in Ecuador and Peru, mostly between the eastern Andes mountain range of southern Ecuador and the northwest region of Peru. More specifically, they inhabit mild forests of the provinces of Azuay, Loja and Morona-Santiago and the Piura department in Peru. They are also found in Selva Alegre which has the largest population of red-faced parrots. Its natural habitat is subtropical or tropical moist montane forests. They have been noted to reside in shrubby growth next to páramo. This parrot is known to have vocalizations to find other flocks of birds in their area.

== Endangered species ==
The red-faced parrot is threatened by habitat loss. Due to a rapidly decreasing habitat, the red-faced parrot is now considered to be Endangered by BirdLife International and the IUCN, and is starting to go extinct.

Studies conducted in southern Ecuador by Mark Jacobs and Jon Walker revealed that the red-faced parrot predominantly resides in the cloud forests of Selva Alegre. These cloud forests are facing ongoing destruction for grazing and agriculture, relieving the red-faced parrot species of a habitat. At this time, habitat loss is the primary source of endangerment for the red-faced parrot.

The population of the red-faced parrot in Selva Alegre estimates from a minimum of 169 to a maximum of 734. Most of the time these birds stay in flocks of 20. They tend to stay in one area, which means that habitat loss can be very dangerous. This small population size puts the red-faced parrot species at risk, as there are less individuals to mate with. This decrease in birth rate makes the species even more vulnerable to the devastating effects of the Selva Alegre habitat loss.

== Breeding ==
The months between August and January are the red-faced parrots' ideal breeding months. These birds nest in trees and usually lay between two and three eggs. At this time, not much is known about the red-faced parrots' breeding behaviors.

== Diet and foraging ==
In the main habitat of the red-faced parrot, they feed on a variety of foods. These include flowers and seeds, miconia fruits, viburnum berries, Weinmannia shoots, and parts of ericaceous trees.

== Vocalizations ==
The Red-faced parrot species is known for their distinct flight call. It consists of several repeated calls of "chek-chek...chek-chek" or "chek-chek-chek…". When in a perched position, they are noted to make a variety of calls. These include nasal calls, such as the sounds "kyek" and "crreet".
