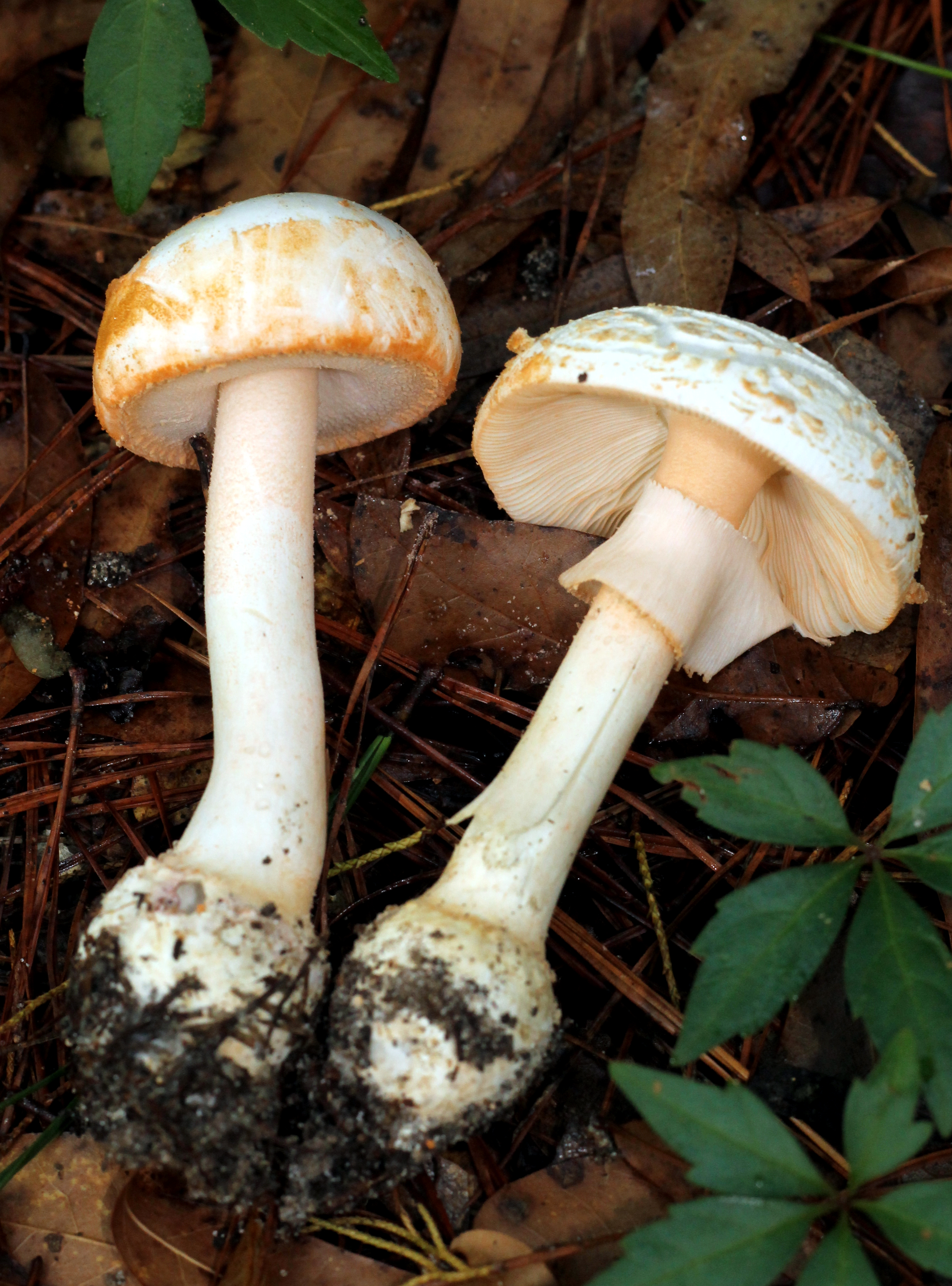

Scientific classification
- Kingdom: Fungi
- Division: Basidiomycota
- Class: Agaricomycetes
- Order: Agaricales
- Family: Amanitaceae
- Genus: Amanita
- Species: A. roseotincta

Binomial name
- Amanita roseotincta (Murrill) Murrill (1914)

Synonyms
- Venenarius roseotinctus Murrill (1914)

= Amanita roseotincta =

Species of fungus

Amanita roseotincta
- Mycological characteristics
- Gills on hymenium
- Cap is convex
- Hymenium is free
- Stipe has a ring and volva
- Spore print is white
- Ecology is mycorrhizal
- Edibility is unknown

Amanita roseotincta is a species of agaric fungus in the family Amanitaceae found in pine and mixed pine-hardwood woodlands in North America. Its fruiting bodies (mushrooms) are characterized by an off-white cap covered with powdery orange volva remnants that quickly fade in color, a bulb-shaped base, a fragile stipe ring, and white gills.

== Taxonomy and phylogeny ==
Amanita roseotincta was first described as Venenarius roseitinctus by American mycologist William Alphonso Murrill in 1914 from material collected by Mrs. F. S. Earle in Mississippi. Murrill transferred the species to Amanita roseitincta later the same year.

The specific epithet refers to the rose or pink (Latin roseus) color or tinge (Latin tincta) of the universal veil remnants. The prefix rosei- used by Murrill uses the genitive stem, while the roseo- prefix takes the ablative form of the Latin adjective, a form more common in compound Latin names describing color tingeing. In 1925 Saccardo's Sylloge fungorum formalized the species as Amanita roseo-tincta. The International Code of Nomenclature, applicable to fungi since 2011, standardized orthography to use the ablative prefix for describing color-tingeing and to remove hyphens; thus, Amanita roseotincta is the accepted name in the Index Fungorum.

Amanita komarekensis is considered a synonym by R. E. Tulloss.

== Description ==
A. roseotincta is a medium-sized Amanita mushroom, with a mature cap ranging from 35-65mm in width and a stipe between 25-150mm in height and 5-20mm in width. Like other Amanita mushrooms, it first appears as an egg or button shape encased by a universal veil; A. roseotincta's is distinct in appearing to have two layers, with the upper layer leaving easily dislodged off-white and quickly darkening pyramidal warts on the cap and the lower layer and partial veil leaving powdery salmon to pink quickly-fading residue on the cap, the underside of the ring, and the stipe.

When fully open, the pileus is convex to flat, sometimes showing striation at the edges. The underlying color is cream to white, dry, sometimes with a slight sheen, though this can be obscured under veil remnants. The gills are free, close, and white to cream, and give a white spore print. The stipe is similarly cream-white under a layer of pink to beige pulverulence (with more nearer to the cap) and can bruise reddish. It ends in a swollen round or elliptoid base that is usually at least partially underground. Salmon-orange fragments of universal veil can remain around the volva. When fresh, a skirt-like ring is present on the stipe, pink-beige to white and striate above and powdery pink below, but it is thin, fragile and easily disturbed or lost.

Due to the unique veil remnants and their tendency to easily dislodge and quickly change color once exposed to light, the mushroom can look significantly different at different developmental stages, with warty, vivid orange powdery buttons becoming relatively nondescript off-white Amanitas with faint residual tan to beige pulvurulence on the cap over time. The upper stipe and underside of the ring can maintain pink and orange coloration for longer than the exposed cap.

A. roseotincta is said to sometimes have a faint, apricot-like odor, most noticeable in large collections.

Microscopically, it is distinguished by ellipsoid, smooth, thin-walled, inamyloid spores, ranging from 8.5-11.8 x 6-8.2μm in size. Its basidia do not have clamps on the base.

=== Similar species ===
Amanita roseotincta is quite similar in appearance to several other fungi in Amanita sect. Amanita.

Amanita armeniaca is known from Australia in sclerophyll and tall open forests. Though A. armeniaca may have a stouter stipe and slightly more durable veil than A. roseotincta, visual distinction is difficult, but they are not found on the same continent.

Amanita cruzii is morphologically and microscopically similar to A. roseotincta, but known only from the Dominican Republic, where it is found in association with native pines, and with introduced Pinus patula in Colombia. A. cruzii does not overlap in range with A. roseotincta.

Amanita rufoferruginea, like A. roseotincta, is covered by a distinct powdery orange coating left from its universal veil, but A. rufoferruginea's is denser and brick-red to orange to brown in color. It has a reputation for leaving rusty orange stains on anything it contacts. A. rufoferruginea is known from Japan, South Korea, China, Taiwan, and the Philippines in association with pine and oak forests. It can sometimes appear for sale in mushroom markets as a potential edible in the Philippines (in the umbrella category of mushrooms known as tabilew in the Kankana-ey language), but is also responsible for confirmed mushroom poisonings. In 2019 it was responsible for one death in China, and in 2022 it was in the top 5 most common mushrooms responsible for psycho-neurological poisoning in China. A. rufoferruginea does not overlap in range with A. roseotincta.

== Distribution and habitat ==
Amanita roseotincta is found in the United States from New Jersey south to Florida and as far west as Texas. It occurs singly and in groups in pine and mixed-pine forests. Amanita guzmanii, a very similar species from southern Mexico, is a suspected synonym pending research and may mean the range extends farther south than previously identified.

== See also ==
- List of Amanita species
