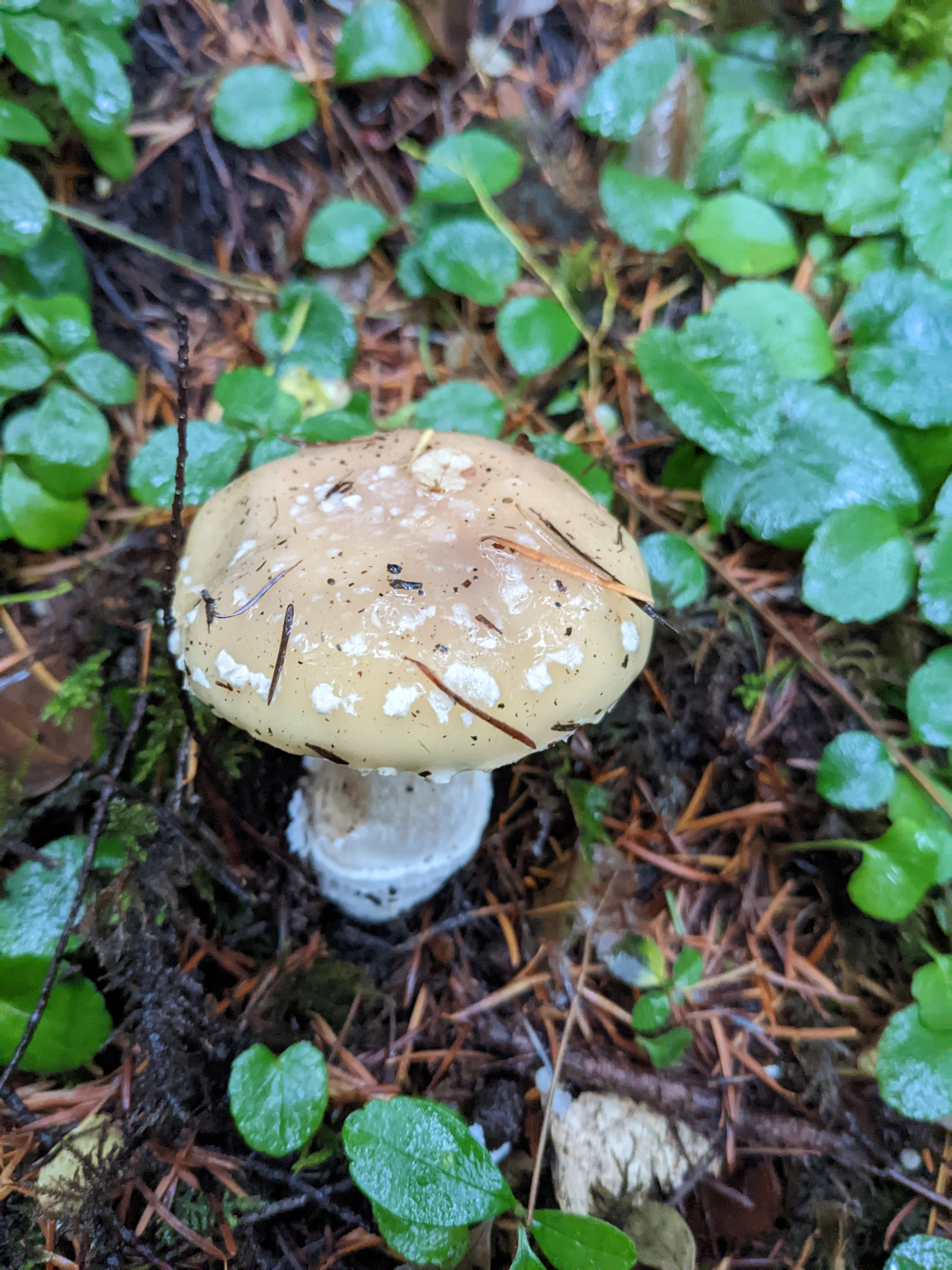

Scientific classification
- Kingdom: Fungi
- Division: Basidiomycota
- Class: Agaricomycetes
- Order: Agaricales
- Family: Amanitaceae
- Genus: Amanita
- Species: A. pantherinoides

Binomial name
- Amanita pantherinoides Murrill (Murrill)

Synonyms
- Amanita pantherina var. pantherinoides (Murrill) D.T. Jenkins; Venenarius pantherinoides Murrill

= Amanita pantherinoides =

Species of mushroom

Amanita pantherinoides
- Mycological characteristics
- Gills on hymenium
- Cap is convex or flat
- Hymenium is adnexed
- Stipe has a ring and volva
- Spore print is white
- Ecology is mycorrhizal
- Edibility is poisonous or psychoactive

Amanita pantherinoides, commonly known as the western panther or western American false panther is a species of mushroom in the family Amanitaceae. It is poisonous, containing ibotenic acid and muscimol.

== Taxonomy ==
Amanita pantherinoides has long been thought to be the same as the species Amanita pantherina, which has similar morphology under certain environmental conditions and at certain stages of maturity, but it is now considered to be a distinct species. A. pantherina occurs in Europe and western Asia, while A. pantherinoides occurs in western North America. Another species with similar morphology, Amanita multisquamosa, occurs in eastern North America.

== Description ==
Amanita pantherinoides has a light brown cap that is about 4–10 cm (1.6–3.9 in) wide. The cap has white warts that sometimes wash off. The stipe is about 5–12 cm (2.0–4.7 in) tall and about 1–2 cm (0.39–0.79 in) wide. The mushroom has a ring and a volva.

== Habitat and ecology ==
Amanita pantherinoides is mycorrhizal and grows under conifers, especially Douglas fir. It is usually found in forests, but occasionally cities as well.
