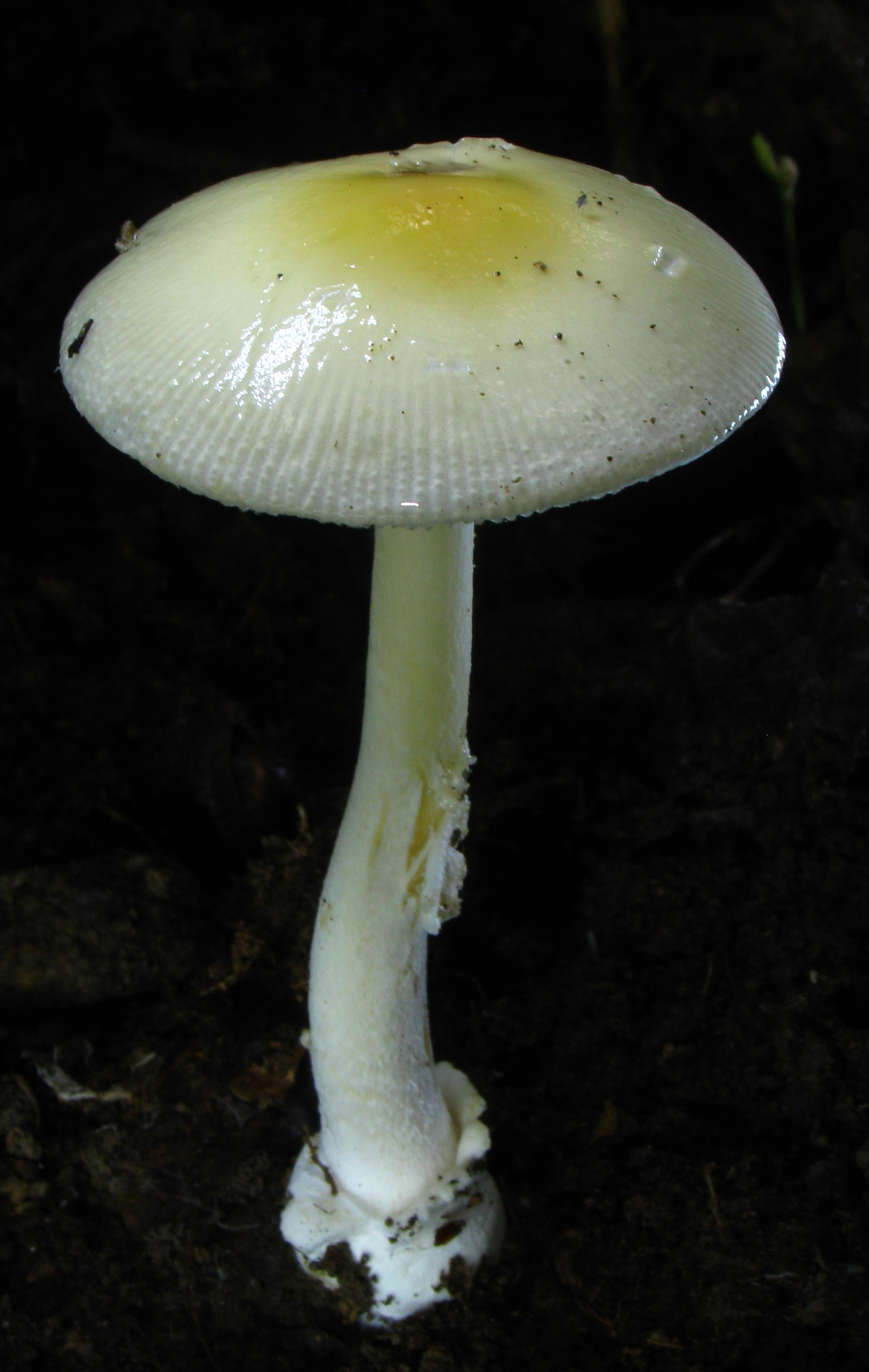

Scientific classification
- Kingdom: Fungi
- Division: Basidiomycota
- Class: Agaricomycetes
- Order: Agaricales
- Family: Amanitaceae
- Genus: Amanita
- Species: A. albocreata

Binomial name
- Amanita albocreata (G.F.Atk.) J.E.Gilbert (1941)

Synonyms
- Amanitopsis albocreata G.F.Atk. (1902); Vaginata albocreata (G.F.Atk.) Murrill (1913)

= Amanita albocreata =

Species of fungus

Amanita albocreata
- Mycological characteristics
- Gills on hymenium
- Cap is flat or convex
- Hymenium is free or adnate
- Stipe has a volva
- Spore print is white
- Ecology is mycorrhizal
- Edibility is poisonous

Amanita albocreata, also called the ringless panther or the ringless panther amanita, is a species of fungus in the family Amanitaceae. It was discovered in 1944 by William Murrill. It is commonly found in the northeastern United States and parts of southeastern Canada. It normally grows between the rainy months of June and August.

== Taxonomy ==
First described in 1902 by George Francis Atkinson under the name Amanitopsis albocreata, the species was then transferred to Amanita in 1941 by Jean-Edouard Gilbert.

== Description ==
- Cap: The length of the cap can vary from 2–8 centimetres (1–3 inches). It can appear convex or shield-shaped. The cap's disc has been seen colored white to pale yellow, with easily removed flaky patches or warts of whitish volva remnants. The center can be tan or creamy yellow in color. Akin to its relative Amanita frostiana, the cap feels smooth and sticky when moist.
- Gills: Gills can be free or slightly adnate. They are about 3–10.5 millimetres (1/8–3/8 in) broad, with a minutely flocculose edge. The short gills are truncate to excavate-truncate with or without an attenuate "tooth" at the juncture with the flesh of the cap. They are cream to pale cream in color.
- Stipe: The stem, or stipe, measures 80–120 x 6–8 mm. It lacks a ring but consists of a volva. The notable bulb (dimensions 15–22 x 12–20 mm) bears a distinct white collar, as do some species with annulate stems, like other Amanita species, A. multisquamosa, A. velatipes, and A. pantherina.
- Spores and microscopic features: The spores measure (7.3-) 7.7–9.5 (-11.6) x 6.6–8.4 (-9.4) μm and are globose to subglobose or occasionally broadly ellipsoid and inamyloid. Clamps are rare at the bases of basidia.
- Flesh: This mushroom has thin and sticky flesh under the cap.

== Distribution and habitat ==
This fungus is found in the hardwood-hemlock (Tsuga) forest of the northeastern United States and southeastern Canada and of boreal forest at least as far north as the Island of Newfoundland. Commonly, it is found in coniferous and deciduous forests or open, lush green grasslands.

== Edibility ==
This species is of unknown edibility and is possibly poisonous.

== See also ==
- List of Amanita species
