= C5H6N2O4 =

The molecular formula C_{5}H_{6}N_{2}O_{4} (molar mass: 158.11 g/mol, exact mass: 158.0328 u) may refer to:

- 4,5-Dihydroorotic acid
- Ibotenic acid, or ibotenate
- Muscazone
