= Amavadin =

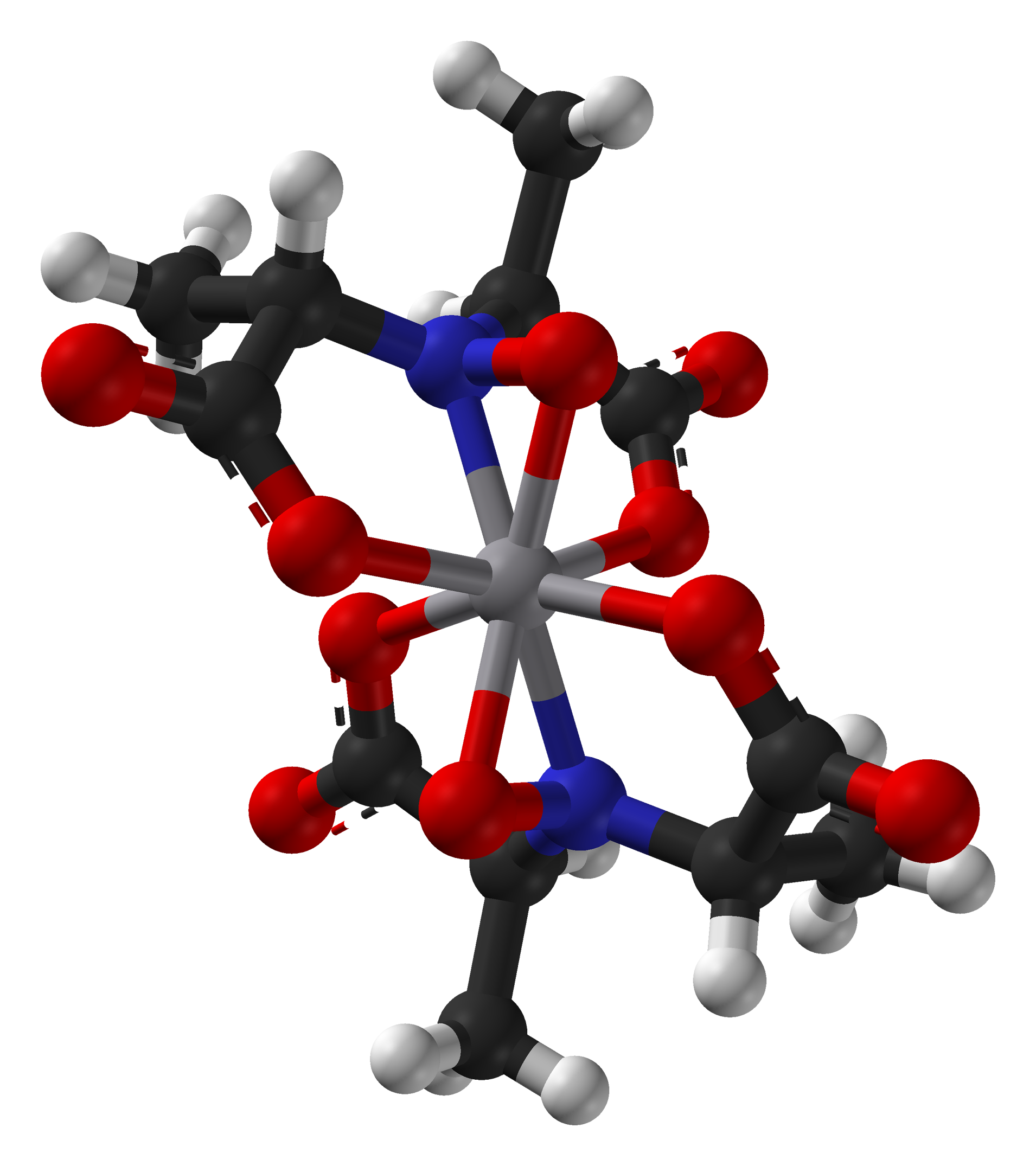
- Ball-and-stick model of the amavadin dianion

Names
- IUPAC name bis[N-[(1S)-1-(carboxy-κO)ethyl]-N-(hydroxy-κO)-L-alaninato(2-)-.κN,κO]-vanadium

Identifiers
CAS Number	12705-99-6
3D model (JSmol)	Interactive image
ChemSpider	52085372 dihydric acid
PubChem CID	119025631 dihydric acid
UNII	5J3H8J7S42
- InChI: InChI=1S/2C6H10NO5.V/c2*1-3(5(8)9)7(12)4(2)6(10)11;/h2*3-4H,1-2H3,(H,8,9)(H,10,11);/q2*-1;+4/p-4 Key: JFEAKSQUSDDXGF-UHFFFAOYSA-J
- SMILES: CC(C(=O)[O-])N(C(C)C(=O)[O-])[O-].CC(C(=O)[O-])N(C(C)C(=O)[O-])[O-].[V+4]

Properties
Chemical formula	[V{NO[CH(CH_{3})CO_{2}]_{2}}_{2}]^{2−}
Molar mass	398.94 g/mol
Appearance	Light blue in solution
- Except where otherwise noted, data are given for materials in their standard state (at 25 °C [77 °F], 100 kPa). verify (what is ?) Infobox references

Amavadin is a vanadium-containing coordination complex that occurs naturally. It is found found in three species of poisonous Amanita mushrooms: A. muscaria, A. regalis, and A. velatipes.

== History and structure ==
The ligand found in amavadin was first synthesized in 1954. Amavadin was first isolated and identified in 1972 by Kneifel and Bayer. In 1993, it was discovered by X-ray crystallography that amavadin is not a vanadyl ion complex. Instead, it is an octacoordinated vanadium(IV) complex. This vanadium center is bonded to two tetradentate ligands derived from N-hydroxyimino-2,2'-dipropionic acid, H_{3}(HIDPA), ligands. The ligands coordinate through the nitrogen and the three oxygen centers.

The anionic complex is blue. It is an eight-coordinate vanadium complex. A Ca^{2+} cation is often used to crystallize amavadin to obtain a good quality X-ray diffraction. Oxidized amavadin can be isolated as its PPh_{4}^{+} salt. The oxidized form contains vanadium(V), which has been studied by NMR spectroscopy.

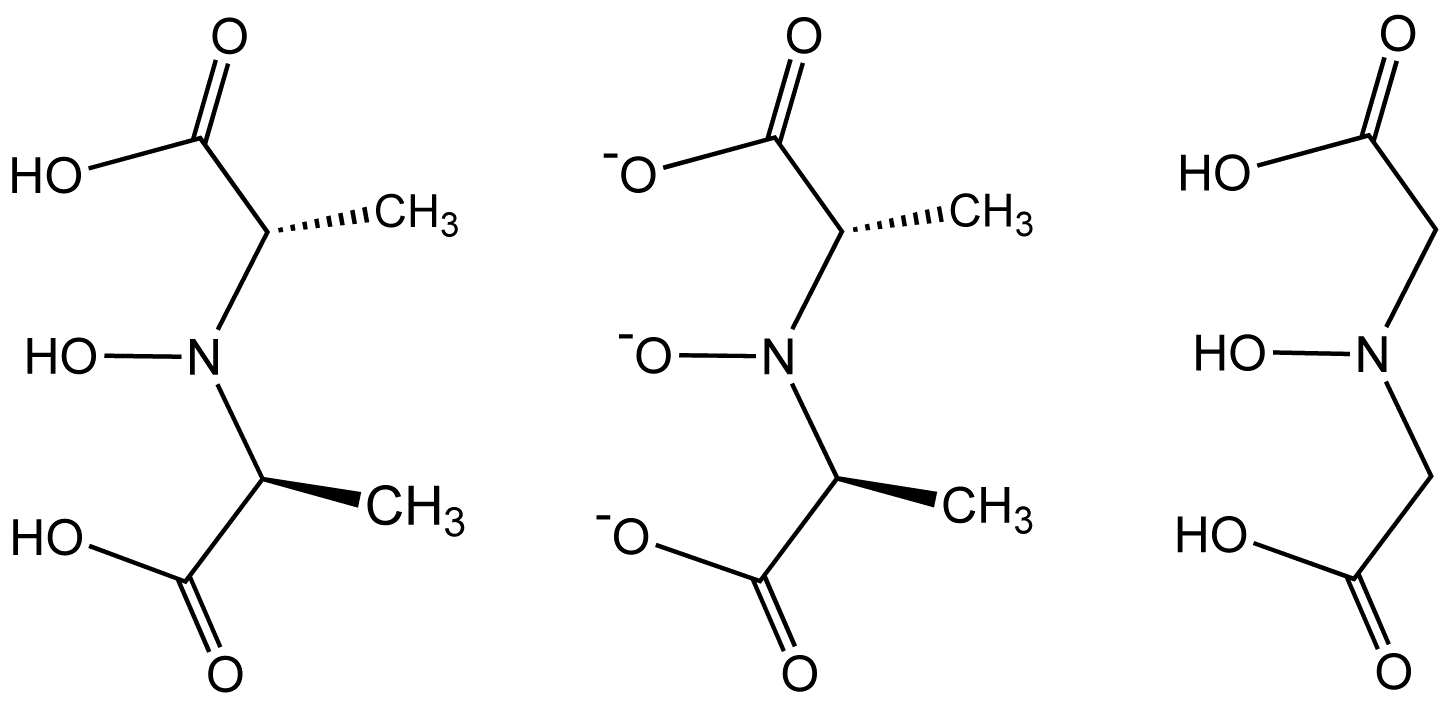
The ligand precursor found in amavadin (left), the ligand (center) and H_{3}(HIDA) (right).

Amavadin contains vanadium(IV). Initially, amavadin was thought to have a vanadyl, VO^{2+}, center.

Amavadin is a C_{2}-symmetric anion with a 3− charge. The twofold axis bisects the vanadium atom perpendicular to the two NO ligands. The anion features five chiral centers, one at vanadium and the four carbon atoms having S stereochemistry. There are two possible diastereomers for the ligands, (S,S)-(S,S)-Δ and (S,S)-(S,S)-Λ.

== Preparation ==
The formation of amavadin begins with the binding of two of the ligands.

2 HON(CH(CH_{3})CO_{2}H)_{2} + VO^{2+} → [V{NO[CH(CH_{3})CO_{2}]_{2}}_{2}]^{2−} + H_{2}O + 4 H^{+}

== Biological function ==
The biological function of amavadin is unknown. It has been speculated that it uses H_{2}O_{2} and acts as a peroxidase to aid the regeneration of damaged tissues. Amavadin may serve as a toxin for protection of the mushroom.

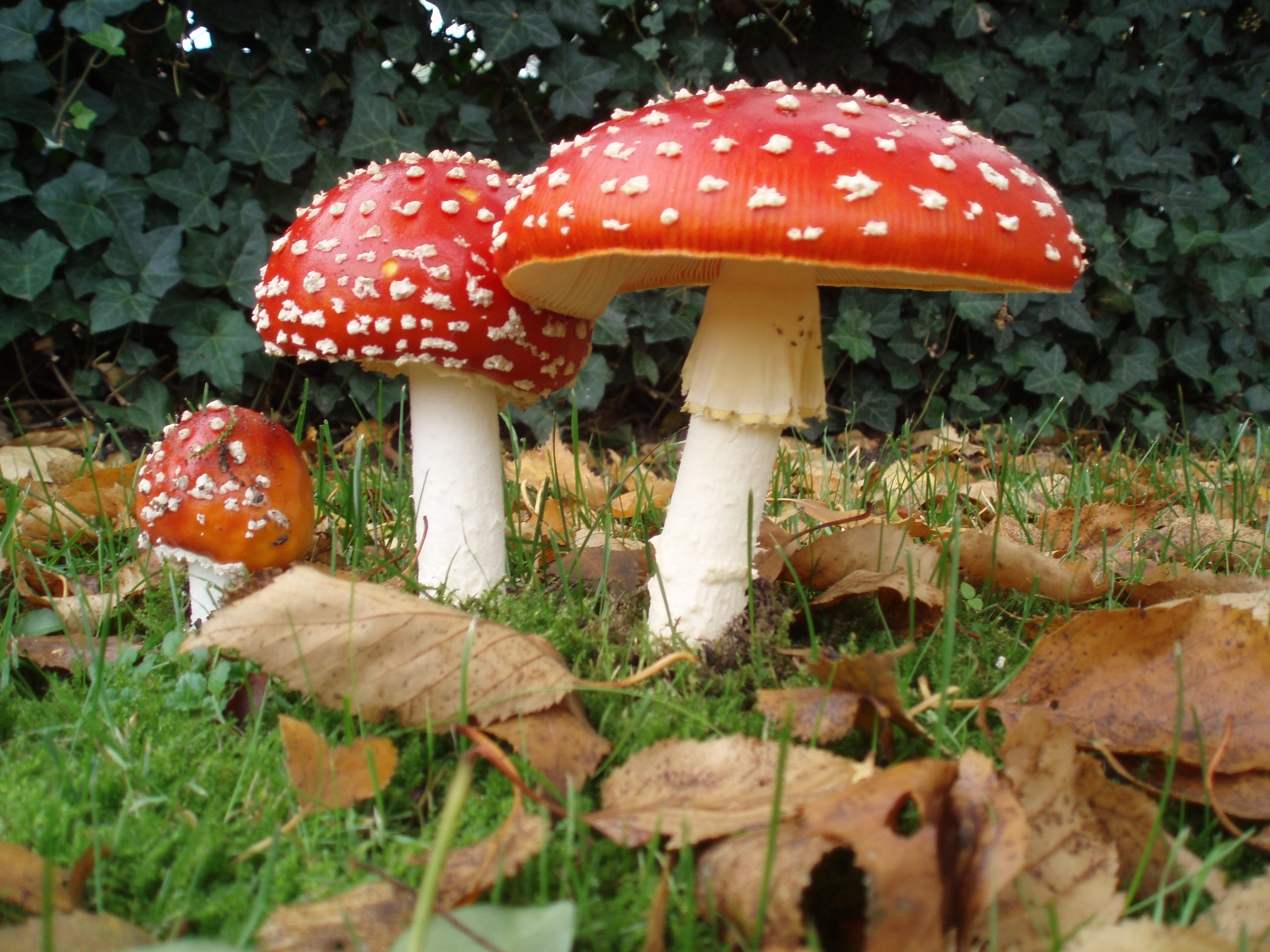
Amanita muscaria contains amavadin
