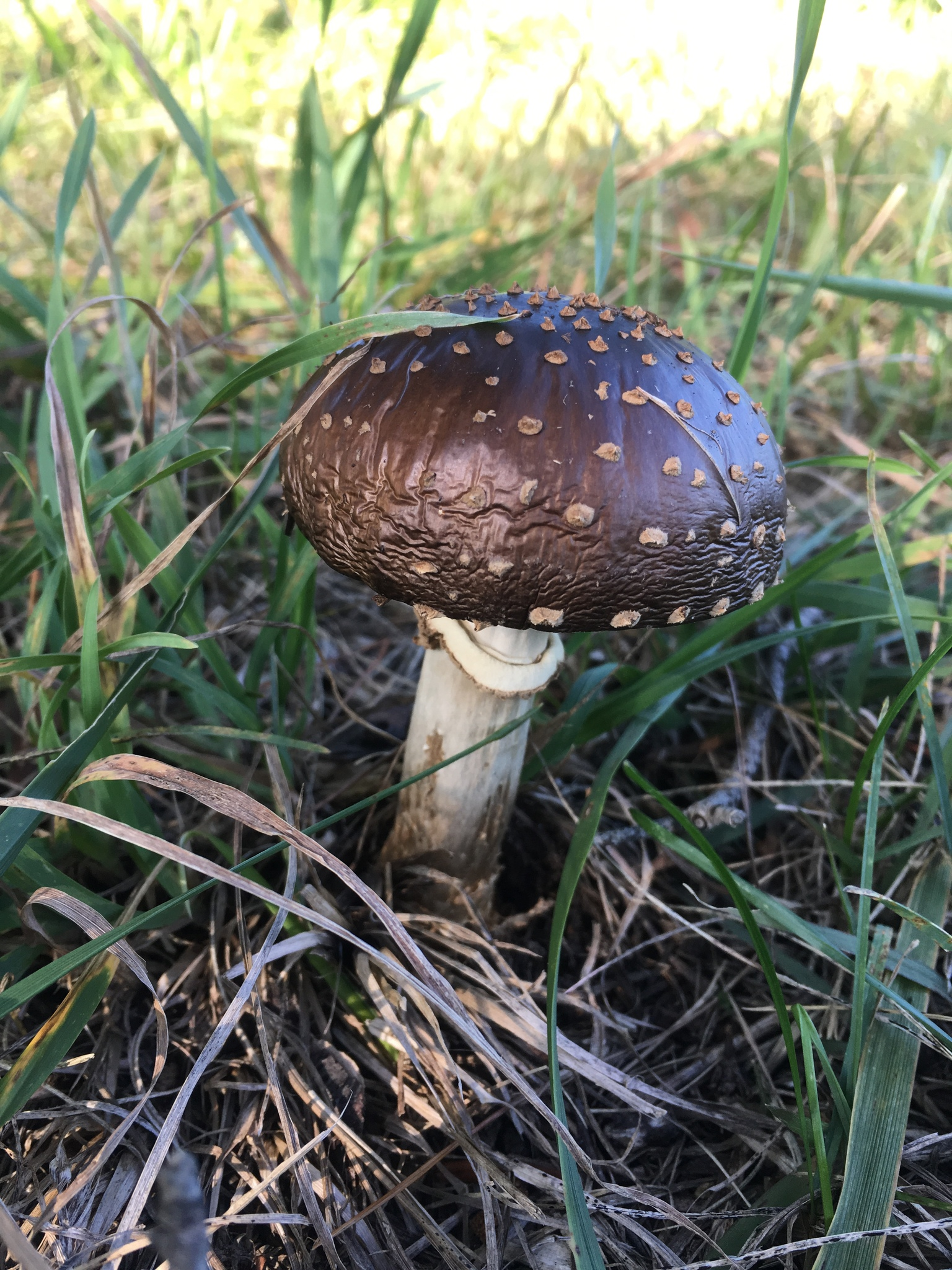

Scientific classification
- Kingdom: Fungi
- Division: Basidiomycota
- Class: Agaricomycetes
- Order: Agaricales
- Family: Amanitaceae
- Genus: Amanita
- Species: A. ibotengutake

Binomial name
- Amanita ibotengutake T. Oda, C. Tanaka & Tsuda, 2002

= Amanita ibotengutake =

Species of fungus

Amanita ibotengutake
- Mycological characteristics
- Gills on hymenium
- Cap is flat
- Hymenium is free
- Stipe has a ring and volva
- Spore print is white
- Ecology is mycorrhizal
- Edibility is poisonous or psychoactive

Amanita ibotengutake is a species of agaric fungus in the family Amanitaceae native to Japan. It was first described in 2002 as distinct on a genetic level from A. pantherina, and earlier has been classified under that name.

The scientific name derives from Japanese name of A. strobiliformis, ibotengutake (疣天狗茸, lit. "wart tengu mushroom"), which inspired the name of ibotenic acid. A. ibotengutake contains ibotenic acid and muscimol, rendering it toxic and psychoactive.
