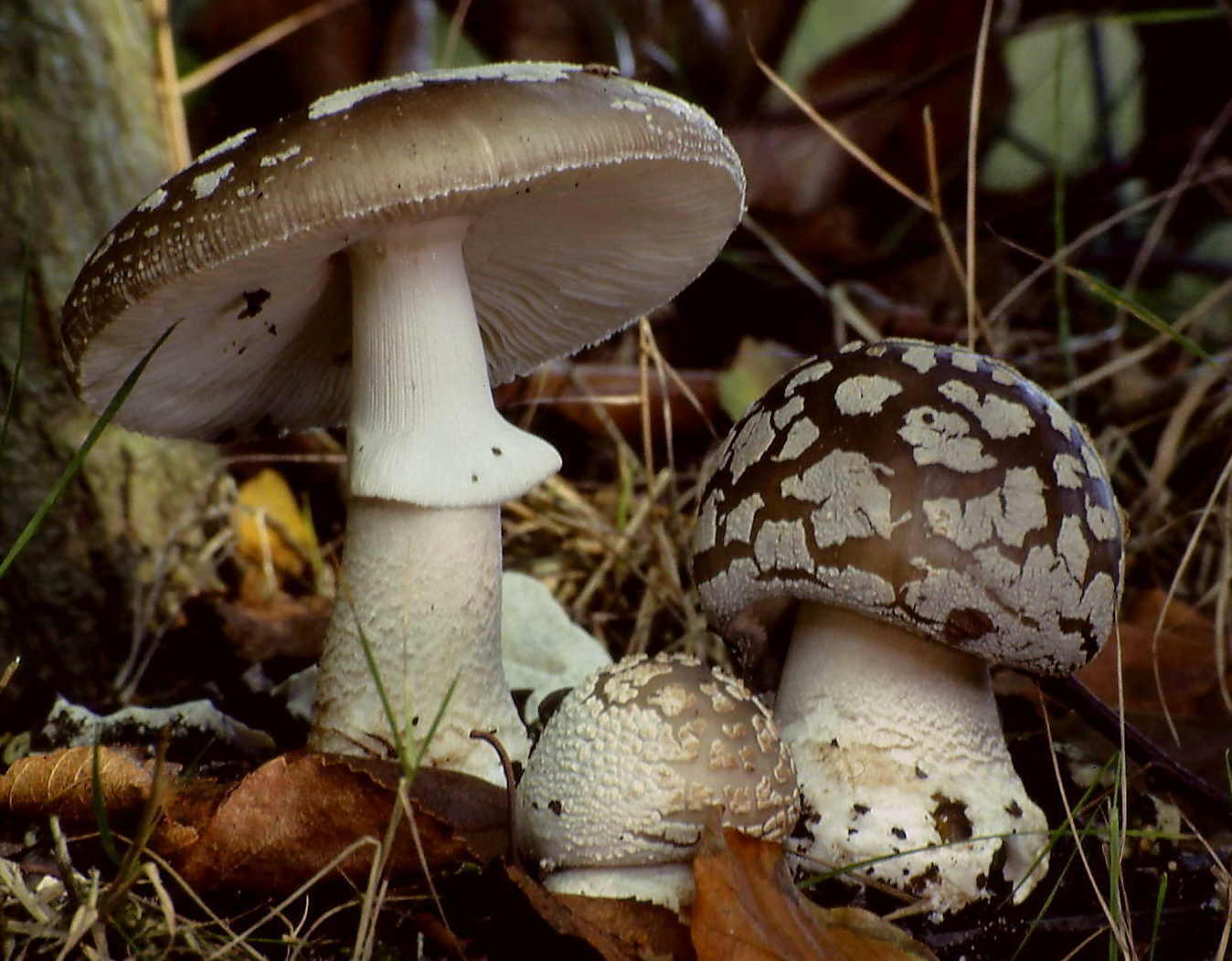

Scientific classification
- Kingdom: Fungi
- Division: Basidiomycota
- Class: Agaricomycetes
- Order: Agaricales
- Family: Amanitaceae
- Genus: Amanita
- Species: A. excelsa

Binomial name
- Amanita excelsa (Fr.) Bertill. (1866)

Synonyms
- Agaricus excelsus Fr. (1821)

= Amanita excelsa =

Species of fungus

Amanita excelsa
- Mycological characteristics
- Gills on hymenium
- Cap is convex or flat
- Hymenium is adnexed
- Stipe has a ring and volva
- Spore print is white
- Ecology is mycorrhizal
- Edibility is inedible

Amanita excelsa, also known as the European false blushing amanita or the grey spotted amanita, is a species of agaric fungus in the family Amanitaceae. It is found in Asia, Africa, Europe, and North America, where it grows in deciduous forests. Appears in groups or singular.

This mushroom is a secondary food source for adults and larvae of the pleasing fungus beetle Tritoma biguttata, or at least its subspecies T.b.affinis.

== Description ==
This mushroom's appearance varies greatly. Cap is hemispherical when young, convex to nearly flat when older, is grey to brown in color and its diameter is 8-12 cm. The cap can become slightly sticky when wet. Gills are white to cream or greyish white, free, crowded, and full to intermediate lengths. The stipe is white to a faint grey, in some cases slightly brown below, can be up to 3 cm thick, 8-10 cm long, has a ring. Bulbous at the base, volva is attached tightly and decreased. Its smell is similar to radish and unpleasant. Spore print is white. Flesh is white and under the cap skin it has a greyish tint.

== Toxicity ==
Amanita excelsa var. alba is inedible.

A. excelsa var. spissa is edible, but can easily be confused with the highly poisonous A. pantherina.
