= C5H8N2O4 =

The molecular formula C_{5}H_{8}N_{2}O_{4} (molar mass: 160.13 g/mol, exact mass: 160.0484 u) may refer to:

- Thymine glycol (5,6-dihydroxy-5,6-dihydrothymine)
- Tricholomic acid
