= Tricholoma muscarium =

Scientific classification
- Domain: Eukaryota
- Kingdom: Fungi
- Division: Basidiomycota
- Class: Agaricomycetes
- Order: Agaricales
- Family: Tricholomataceae
- Genus: Tricholoma
- Species: T. muscarium

Binomial name
- Tricholoma muscarium Kawam. ex Hongo (1959)

Synonyms
- Tricholoma muscarium Kawam. (1954)

Species of fungus

Tricholoma muscarium is a mushroom found in Japan.

== Toxicity ==
Tricholoma muscarium contains ibotenic acid and tricholomic acid and is considered to be an edible mushroom in Japan.
