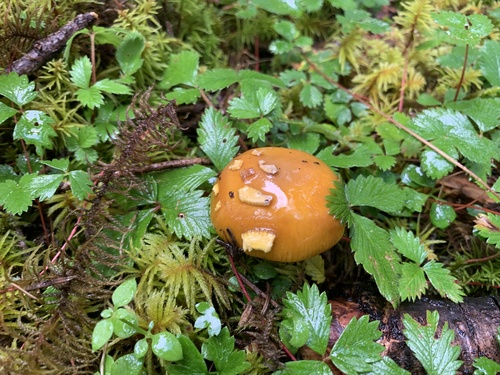

Scientific classification
- Kingdom: Fungi
- Division: Basidiomycota
- Class: Agaricomycetes
- Order: Agaricales
- Family: Amanitaceae
- Genus: Amanita
- Species: A. altipes

Binomial name
- Amanita altipes Zhu L.Yang, M.Weiss & Oberw. (2004)

= Amanita altipes =

Species of fungus

Amanita altipes
- Mycological characteristics
- Gills on hymenium
- Cap is umbonate
- Hymenium is free
- Stipe has a ring and volva
- Spore print is white
- Ecology is mycorrhizal
- Edibility is inedible

Amanita altipes, also called the yellow long-stem amanita, is a species of agaric fungus found in coniferous woodlands in southwestern China.

== Description ==
Amanita altipes is a small to medium-sized agaric with a distinctively yellowish overall coloration. The cap has a diameter of up to 9 centimetres (3 1/2 inches) and is yellow, often brownish towards the centre. The appearance of the cap may be convex to plano-convex. The volva is present as felty, floccose patches, 2–5 millimetres (1/16–3/16 in) wide and up to 1 mm thick. Unlike many of its relatives (e.g. A. pantherina), the remnants of the universal veil do not usually persist on the cap, being easily washed away by rain. The yellowish stipe is relatively long (up to 16 cm or 6 1/2 in) and usually tapers upwards. There is a large, persistent ring. The gills are free, crowded, and white to cream-colored to yellowish. The short gills (lamellulae) are truncate, numerous, and evenly distributed. The spores measure 8.0–10.0 by 7.5–9.5 μm and are spherical (or nearly so) and inamyloid. There are no clamps present at the bases of basidia. The flesh is white in color and inedible.

== Etymology ==
The specific epithet altipes means "referring to the long stipe", and it suits the species as it has a longer stipe compared to its relatives.

== Distribution and habitat ==
This species is widespread in southwestern China, mostly in Yunnan. It has also been reported that it is found in eastern the Himalayas and adjacent regions. It grows on soil in coniferous (Abies, Picea) and broadleaved (Betula, Quercus, Salix) woodland in southwestern China up to an altitude of 4,000 metres (13,000 feet).

== See also ==
- List of Amanita species
