= Tricholomic acid =

Names
- IUPAC name (2S)-2-Amino-2-[(5S)-3-oxo-1,2-oxazolidin-5-yl]acetic acid
- Other names α-Cycloglutamate; α-Amino-3-oxo-5-isoxazolidineacetic acid

Identifiers
CAS Number	2644-49-7
3D model (JSmol)	Interactive image
ChEBI	CHEBI:9690
ChEMBL	ChEMBL260328
ChemSpider	390188
KEGG	C08298
PubChem CID	441456
CompTox Dashboard (EPA)	DTXSID80949327
- InChI: InChI=1S/C5H8N2O4/c6-4(5(9)10)2-1-3(8)7-11-2/h2,4H,1,6H2,(H,7,8)(H,9,10)/t2-,4-/m0/s1 Key: NTHMUJMQOXQYBR-OKKQSCSOSA-N
- SMILES: C1[C@H](ONC1=O)[C@@H](C(=O)O)N

Properties
Chemical formula	C_{5}H_{8}N_{2}O_{4}
Molar mass	160.129 g·mol^{−1}
Melting point	207 °C (405 °F; 480 K) (decomp.)
- Except where otherwise noted, data are given for materials in their standard state (at 25 °C [77 °F], 100 kPa). Infobox references

Tricholomic acid is a non-proteinogenic amino acid found in some mushrooms, including Tricholoma muscarium. It has a chemical structure similar to glutamic acid, hence the synonym cycloglutamate, and it interacts with glutamate receptors. More specifically, trichlomic acid a non-selective glutamate receptor agonist, including of the AMPA, kainate, and NMDA receptors, as well as of metabotropic glutamate receptors (mGluRs). Because glutamate receptors are thought to be responsible for the reception of umami taste, tricholomic acid and close analogues have been investigated as flavor enhancers.

== See also ==
- Ibotenic acid, a related compound found in mushrooms
