= Ibotenic acid =

Naturally occurring glutamate receptor agonist neurotoxin

Clinical data
- Other names: Ibotenic acid; Ibotenate; Premuscimol
- Routes of administration: Oral
- Drug class: NMDA receptor agonist; Metabotropic glutamate receptor agonist; GABA_{A} receptor agonist; Neurotoxin; Hallucinogen
- ATC code: None

Pharmacokinetic data
- Metabolism: Decarboxylation (10–20%)
- Metabolites: Muscimol
- Onset of action: 0.75–1.5 hours Peak: 2–3 hours
- Duration of action: 6–12 hours
- Excretion: Urine (rapid and substantial unchanged)

Identifiers
- IUPAC name: (S)-2-amino-2-(3-hydroxyisoxazol-5-yl)acetic acid
- CAS Number: 2552-55-8
- PubChem CID: 1233
- IUPHAR/BPS: 1371
- ChemSpider: 1196
- UNII: 44AS82FRSI
- KEGG: C10600
- ChEBI: CHEBI:5854
- ChEMBL: ChEMBL284895
- CompTox Dashboard (EPA): DTXSID40893771
- ECHA InfoCard: 100.151.170

Chemical and physical data
- Formula: C_{5}H_{6}N_{2}O_{4}
- Molar mass: 158.113 g·mol^{−1}
- 3D model (JSmol): Interactive image
- Melting point: 151 to 152 °C (304 to 306 °F) °C (anhydrous); 144-146 °C (monohydrate)
- Solubility in water: H_{2}O: 1 mg/mL; 0.1 M NaOH: 10.7 mg/mL; 0.1 M HCl: 4.7 mg/mL mg/mL (20 °C)
- SMILES: O=C1/C=C(\ON1)C(C(=O)O)N
- InChI: InChI=1S/C5H6N2O4/c6-4(5(9)10)2-1-3(8)7-11-2/h1,4H,6H2,(H,7,8)(H,9,10); Key:IRJCBFDCFXCWGO-UHFFFAOYSA-N

Ibotenic acid, or ibotenate, also known as premuscimol or as (S)-2-amino-2-(3-hydroxyisoxazol-5-yl)acetic acid, is a naturally occurring α-amino acid found in certain Amanita mushrooms such as Amanita muscaria. It acts as a potent glutamate receptor agonist. The compound is used as a brain-lesioning agent in scientific research.

Ibotenic acid is a conformationally-restricted analogue of the excitatory neurotransmitter glutamate and acts as a non-selective agonist of glutamate receptors, strongly activating NMDA, group I and II metabotropic glutamate receptors, and weakly activating AMPA and kainate receptors. Taken systemically, it is a prodrug of muscimol, broken down by the liver into this more stable compound, which acts as a potent GABA_{A} and GABA_{A}-ρ receptor agonist. Ibotenic acid is biosynthesized from glutamic acid by hydroxylation catalyzed by an Fe(II)/2-oxoglutarate-dependent oxygenase, with subsequent conversion steps carried out by enzymes encoded within a linked biosynthetic gene cluster.

Ibotenic acid is commonly used in research to create site-specific hippocampal brain lesions in rats, allowing for task relearning due to its interaction with glutamate receptors, and is favored over other agents for its selectivity and long-term stability in saline solution. It causes excitotoxicity by overactivating NMDA receptors, leading to calcium overload and oxidative damage. In contrast, it targets glutamate-gated chloride channels in invertebrates, causing increased chloride permeability without affecting their excitatory glutamate receptors.

== Use and effects ==
Ibotenic acid and the closely related drug muscimol show distinct actions in vitro, with ibotenic acid acting as a glutamate receptor agonist and having excitatory effects, whereas muscimol acts as a GABA_{A} receptor agonist and shows inhibitory and depressant effects. However, oral administration of ibotenic acid in vivo in humans results in partial conversion (10–20%) into muscimol and the rest being rapidly excreted unchanged. In addition, while muscimol is well-established as crossing into the brain, the extent to which unchanged ibotenic acid may reach the brain is unknown. In relation to the preceding, ibotenic acid is a prodrug of muscimol, and has shown similar psychoactive effects as muscimol in humans, such as hallucinogenic and sedative effects, though with greatly reduced potency in comparison and hence higher required doses. The nature of ibotenic acid as a prodrug of muscimol has been said to be analogous to psilocybin as a prodrug of psilocin.

Ibotenic acid has been found to be active at doses of 20 to 100 mg orally. Doses of 50 to 100 mg orally have been said to be roughly equivalent to doses of muscimol of 10 to 15 mg orally in terms of effects. Threshold hallucinogenic effects of muscimol are said to occur at a dose of 6 mg orally, whereas threshold effects with ibotenic acid occur with doses of 30 to 60 mg orally, which are about 5 to 10 times higher in comparison. The onset of ibotenic acid is 45 minutes to 1.5 hours and peak or full effects come on after 2 to 3 hours, while the duration is 6 to 12 hours. Ibotenic acid is substantially excreted before the onset of its effects, supporting involvement of muscimol in mediating its effects.

The effects of ibotenic acid have been reported to include inebriation or intoxication, visual and auditory distortions, narrowing and rotation of the visual field, mild visual spasms, bodily heaviness, lassitude, sleepiness, and heavy sleep. Other effects included dizziness, loss of balance, unsteadiness or wobbly walking, mild muscle twitching (not convulsions), and nausea and vomiting. Thought processes and speech were said to be preserved in contrast to alcohol and no "hallucinations" were said to have occurred. The effects of ibotenic acid and muscimol have been said to be very similar or identical, including effects like hallucinogenic effects, delirium, muscle twitching, and sleep.

Due to ibotenic acid being converted into muscimol, being rapidly excreted, and producing similar effects as muscimol, it has been said that the psychoactive effects of ibotenic acid are probably caused purely by muscimol. However, only 10 to 20% of ibotenic acid is converted into muscimol, and ibotenic acid could theoretically contribute some of its own distinct excitatory effects, though such effects remain poorly characterized. In any case, research on Amanita muscaria mushroom poisonings has reported a mixture and alternation of excitatory effects attributed to ibotenic acid and inhibitory effects attributed to muscimol. However, it is unclear if these apparent "excitatory" effects are actually due to unchanged ibotenic acid and its actions such as NMDA receptor agonism, with the pharmacology of Amanita muscaria remaining poorly understood and more research being needed. Nonetheless, Povl Krogsgaard-Larsen has described use of ibotenic acid-containing Amanita mushrooms as "crazy", and has said that he would seriously warn against such use, due to the fact that ibotenic acid is a powerful neurotoxin and the possibility that some unchanged ibotenic acid could reach the brain and produce neurotoxicity. No brain lesions attributable to Amanita muscaria have ever been reported in humans, but there has also been very little investigation in this area.

One fruiting body (basidiocarp) of Amanita muscaria of average weight (50–70 g in terms of fresh weight) may contain up to 70 mg ibotenic acid and around 6 mg muscimol and may be sufficient to produce significant intoxication. Amanita muscaria may contain more ibotenic acid relative to muscimol compared to Amanita pantherina. Some preparation methods of Amanita muscaria, such as drying or heating, decarboxylate ibotenic acid into muscimol prior to consumption, in turn resulting in a dramatic (5–6-fold) increase in potency. The substantial amounts of ibotenic acid and muscimol excreted in urine following consumption underpin historical accounts of Siberian urine recycling practices involving Amanita muscaria mushrooms.

== Overdose and toxicity ==
Ibotenic acid is about 4-fold less toxic than muscimol in terms of median lethal dose (LD_{50}) in mice. Symptoms associated with ibotenic acid poisoning or toxicity in humans usually onset within 30 to 60 minutes and include a range of nervous system effects. The most common symptoms include nausea, vomiting, and drowsiness. However, after the first hour, symptoms begin to include confusion, euphoria, visual and auditory distortions, sensations of floating, and retrograde amnesia. Symptoms are slightly different for children, typically beginning after 30 to 180 minutes, with dominant symptoms in children including ataxia, obtundation, and lethargy. Seizures are occasionally reported, however, more commonly with children.

=== Management ===
Treatment of ibotenic acid toxicity centers around supportive care and treatment of symptoms; no antidote is available. Gastric decontamination with activated charcoal or gastric lavage can be of benefit if the patient presents early. The psychotropic effects and hallucinations ibotenic acid and its metabolite muscimol produce are best managed in a quiet environment with minimal stimulation. Benzodiazepines can be of benefit in agitated or panicked patients; they can also be used to control seizures if they occur. Benzodiazepines as GABA_{A} receptor positive allosteric modulators interact with muscimol as a GABA_{A} receptor agonist and may cause a significantly increased risk of depressant effects. Airway management may be required if sedation is profound. Symptoms usually resolve within a few hours of ingestion but can last for days following significant exposures. Monitoring for the presence of brain lesions may be required following a large or repeated exposure. Other measures may be required if the patient has been exposed to a mushroom such as Amanita muscaria as other active compounds may be present.

== Pharmacology ==
=== Pharmacodynamics ===
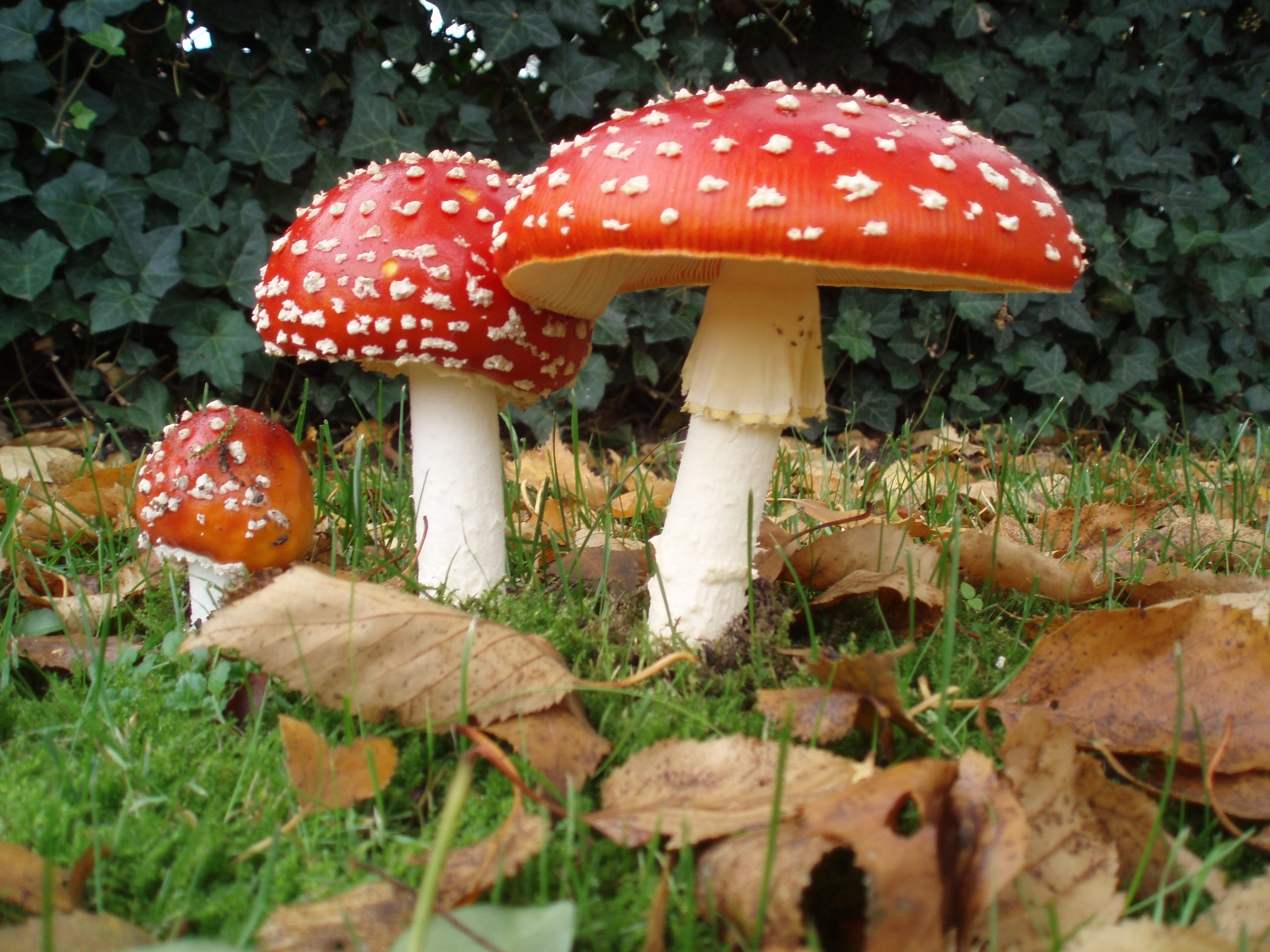
Amanita muscaria, which contains ibotenic acid.

Ibotenic acid acts as a potent agonist of glutamate receptors, including the NMDA receptor and the group I (mGluR1 and mGluR5) and II (mGluR2 and mGluR3) metabotropic glutamate receptors. It is inactive at group III mGluRs. The drug also acts as a weak agonist of the AMPA and kainate receptors. In addition to its actions at glutamate receptors, ibotenic acid acts indirectly as a potent GABA_{A} and GABA_{A}-ρ receptor agonist via metabolism into muscimol.

Activated NMDAR.

When administered directly into the brain, ibotenic acid produces excitotoxic neurotoxicity via activation of NMDA receptors. NMDA receptors are related to synaptic plasticity and work with metabotropic glutamate receptors to establish long-term potentiation or LTP. The process of long term potentiation is believed to be related to the acquisition of information. The NMDA receptor functions properly by allowing Ca^{2+} ions to pass through after activation at the receptor site. The binding of ibotenic acid allows excess Ca^{2+} into the system which results in neuronal cell death. Ca^{2+} also activates CaM-KII or Ca^{2+}/Calmodulin Kinase which phosphorylates multiple enzymes. The activated enzymes then begin producing reactive oxygen species which damages surrounding tissue. The excess Ca^{2+} results in the enhancement of the mitochondrial electron transport system which will further increase the number of reactive oxygen species. Ibotenic neurotoxicity can be enhanced by NMDA receptor co-agonist glycine and can be blocked by the NMDA receptor antagonist dizocilpine.

Ibotenic acid and muscimol administered systemically have been found to produce similar effects in rodents, but with ibotenic acid being about 5- to 10-fold less potent than muscimol. These effects include nervousness, excitation, reduced food intake, wide-open eyes and pupil dilation, convulsions, muscle twitches, tonic cramps, catalepsy, irregular and often faster breathing, sedation, and sleep. The similar effects of ibotenic acid and muscimol with systemic administration in rodents, in spite of their differing mechanisms of action, may be attributed to the fact that ibotenic acid acts as a prodrug of muscimol via this route of administration. Unlike muscimol, the principal psychoactive constituent of Amanita muscaria that is understood to cause sedation and delirium, ibotenic acid's psychoactive effects in humans are not known to be independent of it serving as a prodrug to muscimol, although some researchers have speculated that ibotenic acid would produce stimulant-like effects. In contrast to the case of direct administration into the brain, systemically administered ibotenic acid did not produce neurotoxicity in rodents even at high and potentially fatal doses. However, a subsequent and more modern study found that although no overt tissue damage occurred, there was a marked reduction in Nissl bodies in the cerebral cortex and hippocampus with high and lethal doses, whereas neuronal, astrocyte, and microglia populations were unaffected.

Besides its central nervous system (CNS) actions, ibotenic acid is a flavor enhancer, evoking the umami taste, similarly to the related compounds like monosodium glutamate (MSG) and tricholomic acid. It has been found to activate the TAS1R1/TAS1R3 heterodimer receptor, which is implicated in producing umami taste, with several-fold greater potency than MSG. However, activation of the metabotropic glutamate mGlu_{1} and mGlu_{4} receptors may also contribute to the elicitation of umami taste, with ibotenic acid known to be an mGlu_{1} receptor agonist.

Unlike in mammals, ibotenic acid has a completely different action in invertebrates. Instead of an excitatory effect, it increases the permeability of invertebrate skeletal muscle and nerve cell membranes to chloride ions but shows no affinity for invertebrate glutamate excitatory receptors. This effect was first observed in locust muscle fibers, leading to the discovery of a new ion channel, the glutamate-gated chloride channel (GluCl), which was later cloned from the soil nematode C. elegans. Similar effects have been observed in other invertebrate excitable cells, including Drosophila melanogaster neurons and crayfish muscle. Since GluCl does not exist in vertebrates, it has become a valuable target for anti-parasitic drugs such as avermectin and ivermectin.

=== Pharmacokinetics ===
Ibotenic acid is rapidly and substantially excreted unchanged in urine between 20 to 90 minutes following oral administration. In addition, about 10 to 20% of ibotenic acid is metabolized into muscimol via decarboxylation. This conversion has been found to occur in stomach, liver, and brain in preclinical research. Ibotenic acid is substantially excreted before the onset of its effects in humans, with its onset typically being 45 minutes to 1.5 hours and peak effects occurring after 2 to 3 hours. It is thought that ibotenic acid acts as a prodrug of muscimol when taken orally. Accordingly, the drug produces similar effects as muscimol, including hallucinogenic effects and sedation, but with about 5- to 10-fold lower potency in comparison. However, some ibotenic acid theoretically might still reach the brain and produce associated neurotoxicity. Both ibotenic acid and muscimol are said to be presumably capable of crossing the blood–brain barrier, probably via active transport mechanisms, although this is only definitely known in the case of muscimol. It is unknown how much ibotenic acid actually enters the brain.

== Chemistry ==
Ibotenic acid is an isoxazole derivative and a conformationally constrained analogue of the major excitatory neurotransmitter glutamic acid (glutamate). The chemical properties of ibotenic acid have been described. It is highly water-soluble, with a predicted log P of –2.4 to –3.9. The compound is said to be highly unstable and rapidly decomposes into muscimol in solution without involvement of enzymes. Drying and/or heating ibotenic acid also rapidly leads to decarboxylation of the compound into muscimol. Ibotenic acid can decompose into muscazone via exposure to UV radiation as well.

=== Synthesis ===
The chemical synthesis if ibotenic acid has been described.

=== Analogues ===
Analogues of ibotenic acid include muscimol, glutamic acid (glutamate), tricholomic acid, quisqualic acid, kainic acid, domoic acid, AMAA, and AMPA, among others.

== Natural occurrence ==
Ibotenic acid naturally occurs in Amanita mushroom species. It is best-known for occurring in the species Amanita muscaria and Amanita pantherina. However, the compound has been detected in at least 16 Amanita species in total. These other species include the European species Amanita cothurnata, Amanita gemmata, and Amanita regalis; the Japanese species Amanita ibotengutake; and the Chinese species Amanita altipes, Amanita concentrica, Amanita flavopantherina, Amanita griseopantherina, Amanita parvisychnopyramis, Amanita pseudopantherina, Amanita pseudosychnopyramis, Amanita rubrovolvata, Amanita subglobosa, and Amanita sychnopyramis. Ibotenic acid appears to serve as an insecticide in these species, which led to the name "fly agaric" or "fly killer" for Amanita muscaria.

=== Biosynthesis ===
Ibotenic acid's biosynthetic genes are organized in a physically linked biosynthetic gene cluster. The biosynthetic pathway is initiated by hydroxylation of glutamic acid by a dedicated Fe(II)/2-oxoglutarate-dependent oxygenase. The reaction yields threo-3-hydroxyglutamic acid, which is converted into ibotenic acid, likely by enzymes encoded in the biosynthetic gene cluster.

== History ==
Ibotenic acid was first described in the scientific literature in 1964 upon isolation from by Tsunematsu Takemoto and colleagues. It was first synthesized in 1965. The properties and effects of ibotenic acid in humans were first described by Peter G. Waser and W. Theobald and colleagues in the late 1960s. Subsequently, they were further described by Jonathan Ott and W. Scott Chilton in the mid-1970s. The neurotoxic (brain-damaging) effects of ibotenic acid were first described by 1979. Ibotenic acid was found to be sold online in 2023.

== Society and culture ==
=== Legal status ===
Ibotenic acid is said to have not been a controlled substance and hence to be legal as of 2005. Subsequently however, the compound has become a controlled substance in various countries, such as the United Kingdom in May 2016 (via the Psychoactive Substances Act), Australia in February 2024, Lithuania in January 2025, Poland in May 2025, France in July 2026, and Monaco in August 2026. Though ibotenic acid is not a controlled substance in the United States, the Food and Drug Administration (FDA) banned muscimol, ibotenic acid, and muscarine in food products in December 2024. In addition to controls specifically on ibotenic acid, Amanita muscaria mushrooms, which contain ibotenic acid, have been banned in some countries, such as Romania, the Netherlands, and Poland, among others.

== Use in research ==
=== Brain-lesioning agent ===
Ibotenic acid used for the lesioning of rat's brains is kept frozen in a phosphate-buffered saline solution at a pH of 7.4, and can be kept for up to a year with no loss in toxicity. Injection of 0.05 to 0.1 μL of ibotenic acid directly into the hippocampus at a rate of 0.1 μL/min resulted in semi-selective lesioning. Hippocampal lesioning led to a considerable loss of cells in pyramidal cells (CA1–CA3) as well as granule cells in the dentate gyrus. Ibotenic acid lesioning also causes some damage to axons along the perforant pathway.

Typically, when lesioning is done with other chemicals, the subject cannot re-learn a task. However, due to ibotenic acid's reactivity with glutamate receptors such as the NMDA receptor, ibotenic acid lesioning does allow the subject to re-learn tasks. Ibotenic acid lesioning is thus preferred in studies where re-learning a task after lesioning is essential. Compared to other lesioning agents, ibotenic acid is one of the most site-specific; however, less-damaging alternatives are presently sought.

== See also ==
- Conotoxin
- Grayanotoxin
- Tetrodotoxin
