= Amanita concentrica =

Scientific classification
- Kingdom: Fungi
- Division: Basidiomycota
- Class: Agaricomycetes
- Order: Agaricales
- Family: Amanitaceae
- Genus: Amanita
- Species: A. concentrica

Binomial name
- Amanita concentrica T. Oda, C. Tanaka & M. Tsuda, 2002

Species of fungi

Amanita concentrica is a species of basidiomycete fungi that belongs to the family Amanitaceae. It is native to Japan and China. It is a medium to large sized fungus with a white to yellowish-white color.

== Taxonomy ==
It is one of about 600 described species of fungi belonging to this genus. In it, it is a member of the subgenus Amanita and the section Amanita.

== Distribution ==
This species is native to Japan (Chiba Prefecture) and southwestern China. It can also be found in India and Thailand. In Japan, it can be found evergreen broad-leaved forest of Castanopsis cuspidata var. sieboldii (chinquapin) and Quercus glauca (ring-cupped oak).

== Description ==
Its pileus is white to dirty white in color with a diameter of 7-13 mm. It is characterized by its many pyramidal warts on the pileus and its striate margin. It has a distinct ascending concentric rings at upper part of stipe bulb and inamyloid basidiospores.

== See also ==
- List of Amanita species
