= Amanita pseudoregalis =

Scientific classification
- Kingdom: Fungi
- Division: Basidiomycota
- Class: Agaricomycetes
- Order: Agaricales
- Family: Amanitaceae
- Genus: Amanita
- Species: A. pseudoregalis

Binomial name
- Amanita pseudoregalis Pluvinage

Amanita pseudoregalis
- Mycological characteristics
- Gills on hymenium
- Cap is convex or ovate
- Hymenium is free
- Stipe has a ring and volva
- Spore print is white
- Ecology is mycorrhizal
- Edibility is poisonous

Amanita pseudoregalis, or the false royal fly agaric, is a species of mushroom from the Amanita genus. It can be found in Italy, the island of Sardinia, and France. It has a large, white cap with white warts and a tall, ringed stem with a bulbous base. It is a mycorrhizal fungus; it mostly appears in woodlands from summer to fall, and its appearance can be striking.
