= Muscazone =

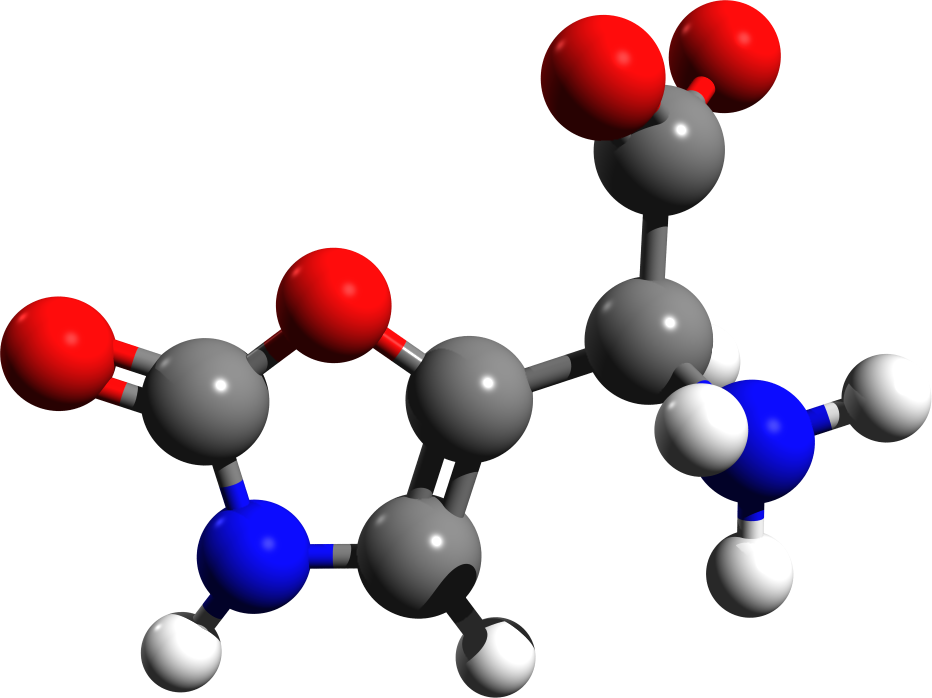

Names
- IUPAC name 2-Amino-2-(2-oxo-3H-1,3-oxazol-5-yl)acetic acid
- Other names Muscazon; α-Amino-2,3-dihydro-2-oxo-5-oxazoleacetic acid; α-Amino-2-oxo-4-oxazoline-5-acetic acid

Identifiers
CAS Number	2255-39-2
3D model (JSmol)	Interactive image
ChemSpider	16735919
ECHA InfoCard	100.017.141
EC Number	218-853-4
PubChem CID	92925
UNII	K97K88B7WE
CompTox Dashboard (EPA)	DTXSID80893775
- InChI: InChI=1S/C5H6N2O4/c6-3(4(8)9)2-1-7-5(10)11-2/h1,3H,6H2,(H,7,10)(H,8,9)/t3-/m1/s1 Key: ASBGWPLVVIASBE-GSVOUGTGSA-N; InChI=1/C5H6N2O4/c6-3(4(8)9)2-1-7-5(10)11-2/h1,3H,6H2,(H,7,10)(H,8,9)/t3-/m1/s1 Key: ASBGWPLVVIASBE-GSVOUGTGBI
- SMILES: O=C([O-])[C@H]([NH3+])C\1=C\NC(=O)O/1

Properties
Chemical formula	C_{5}H_{6}N_{2}O_{4}
Molar mass	158.113 g·mol^{−1}
Appearance	Crystalline solid
Melting point	190 °C (374 °F; 463 K) (decomposes)
- Except where otherwise noted, data are given for materials in their standard state (at 25 °C [77 °F], 100 kPa). verify (what is ?) Infobox references

Muscazone is an amino acid derivative found in Amanita muscaria (fly agaric) mushrooms. It is a photodegradation product of ibotenic acid. The human psychoactivity of muscazone is unknown, but it is said to have weak activity in neurochemical tests. Muscazone was first described in the scientific literature by 1965. Other notable compounds found in Amanita muscaria include ibotenic acid, muscimol, and muscarine.

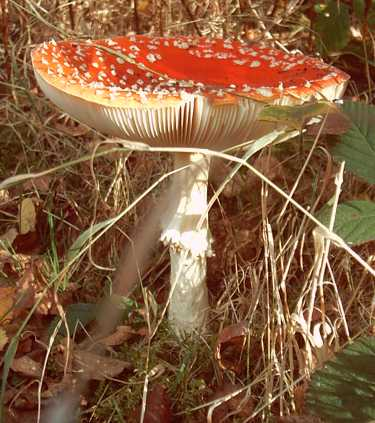
Amanita muscaria contains muscazone.

== See also ==
- Amanita muscaria
- Ibotenic acid
- Muscimol
- Muscarine
