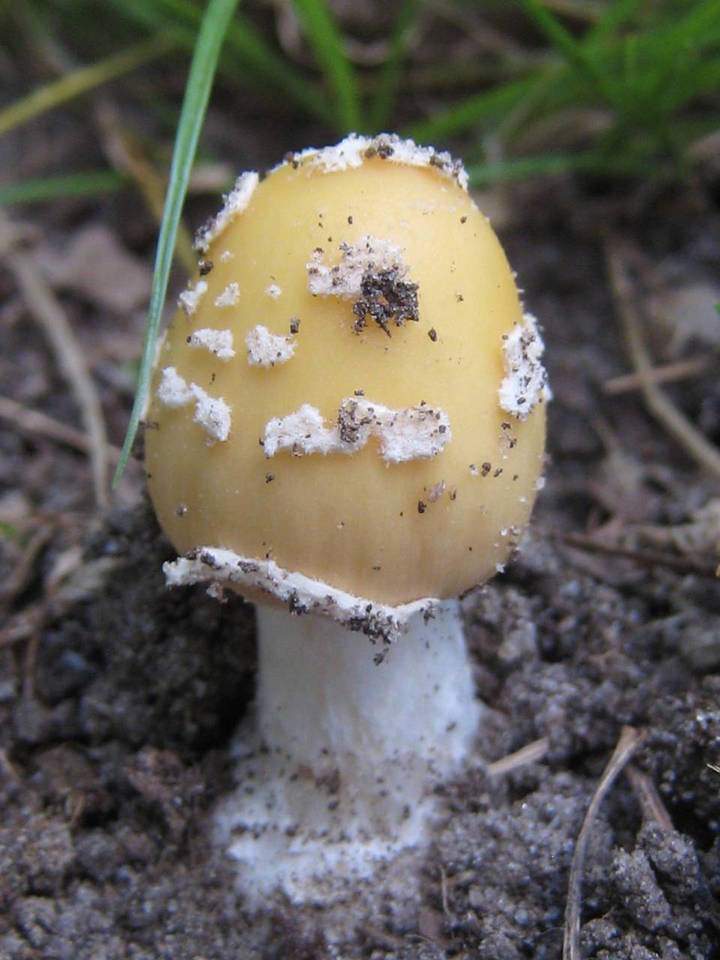

Scientific classification
- Domain: Eukaryota
- Kingdom: Fungi
- Division: Basidiomycota
- Class: Agaricomycetes
- Order: Agaricales
- Family: Amanitaceae
- Genus: Amanita
- Species: A. velatipes

Binomial name
- Amanita velatipes G. F. Atk.

= Amanita velatipes =

Species of mushroom

Amanita velatipes or veiled-bulb amanita is a species of Amanita from eastern North America.

== Gallery ==
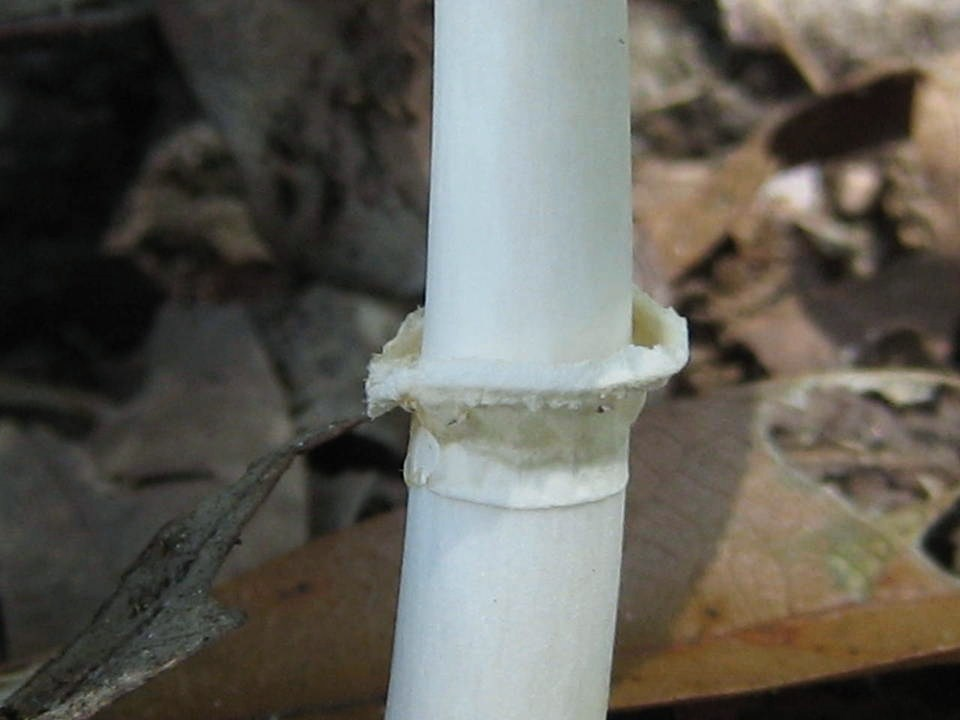
Stipe

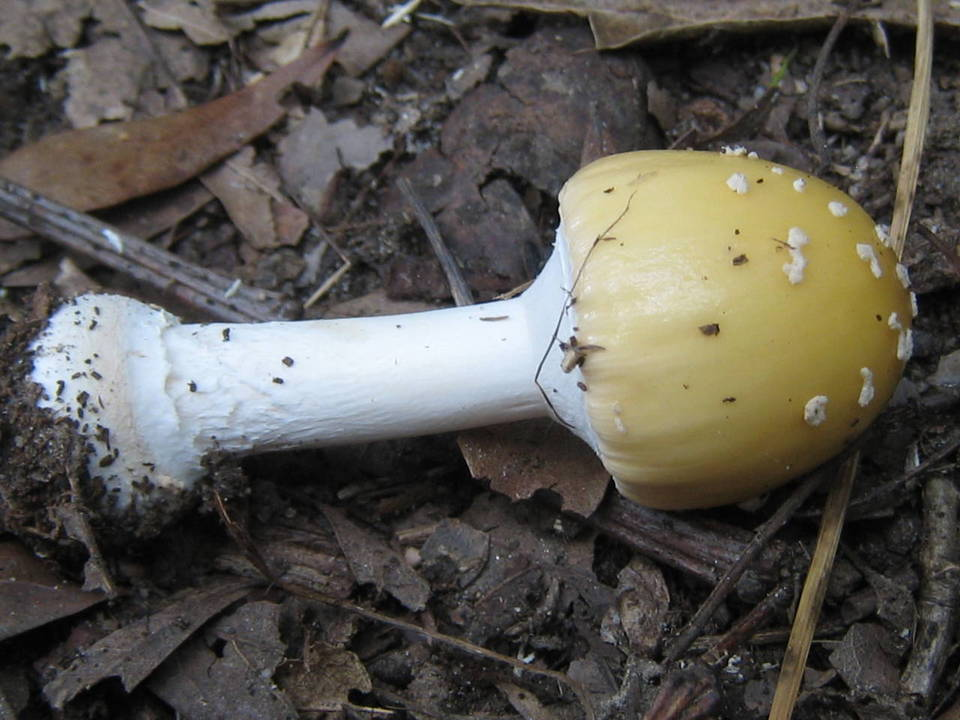

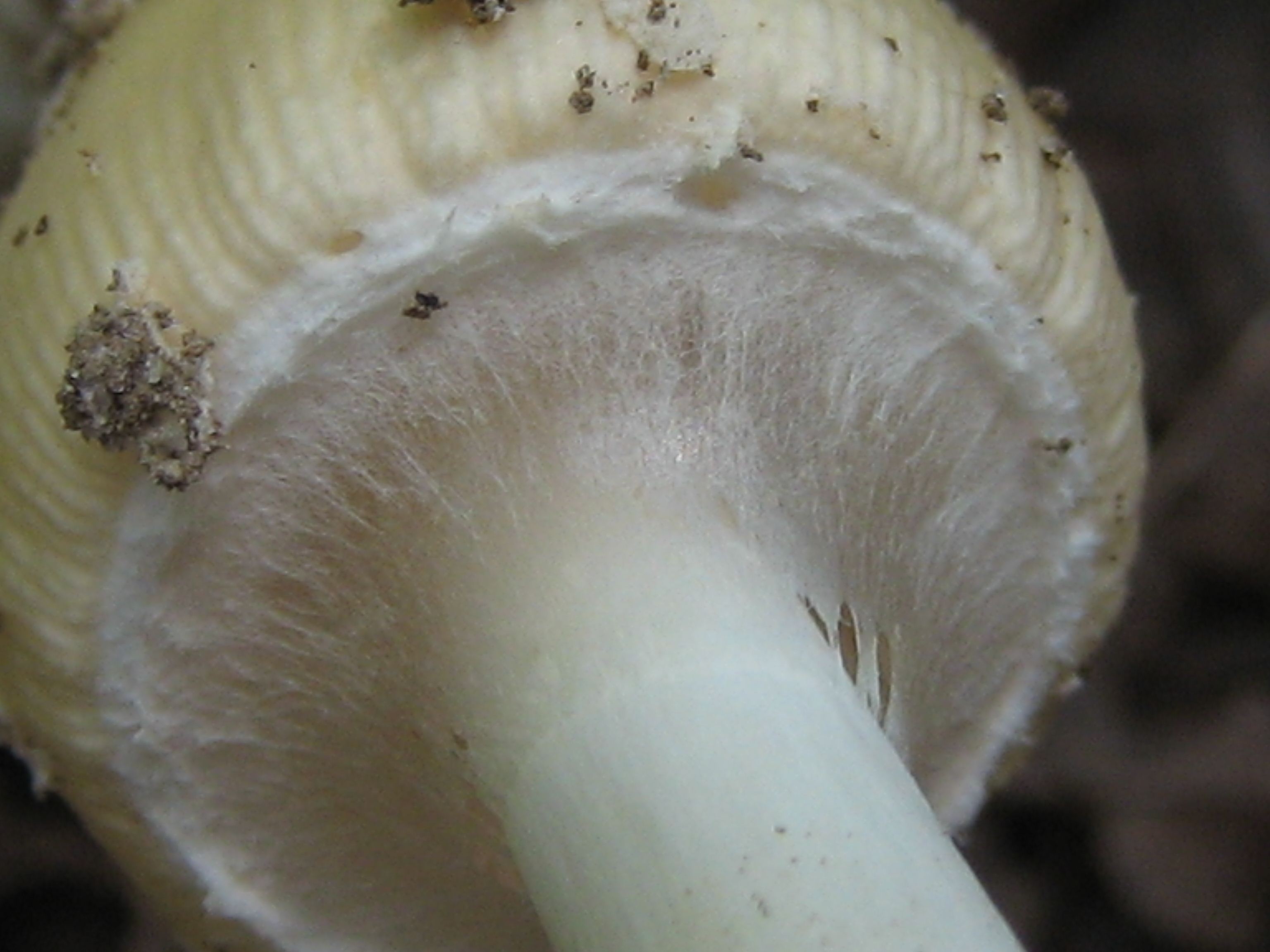
