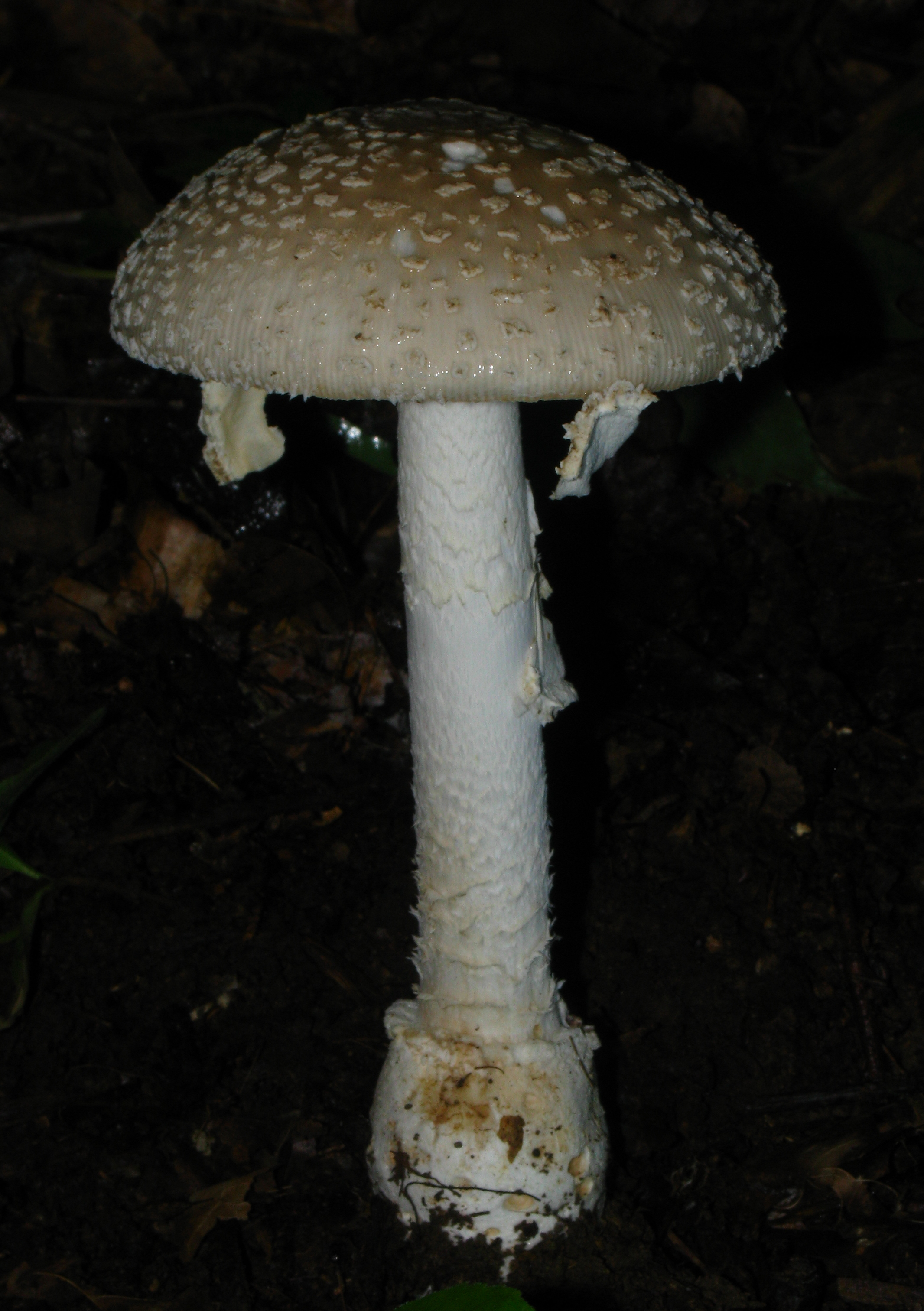

Scientific classification
- Kingdom: Fungi
- Division: Basidiomycota
- Class: Agaricomycetes
- Order: Agaricales
- Family: Amanitaceae
- Genus: Amanita
- Species: A. multisquamosa

Binomial name
- Amanita multisquamosa Peck 1901

= Amanita multisquamosa =

Species of fungus

Amanita multisquamosa
- Mycological characteristics
- Gills on hymenium
- Cap is convex or flat
- Hymenium is free
- Stipe has a ring and volva
- Spore print is white
- Ecology is mycorrhizal
- Edibility is unknown

Amanita multisquamosa or the small funnel-veil amanita is a species of Amanita from the coniferous forest of eastern North America.

== Description ==
Amanita multisquamosa is a mycorrhizal mushroom found in coniferous and deciduous forest in eastern North America.

Amanita multisquamosa has a convex cap that turns flat by age it is 30–110 mm wide It has a rather pallid cap with a disc that is tinted tan or brown; the cap margin is striate. It has multiple whitish to yellowish warts. The gills of Amanita multisquamosa are free, crowded, and white. The stipe is 35 - 130 × 3 - 12 mm. It is white, has a volva, and has a ring. The ring on this mushroom is often pulled up by the expansion of the pileus and so it looks funnel-shaped. The white spores are (6.6–) 7.0–11.2 (–15.0) × (5.2–) 5.6–8.4 (–8.7) μm and are imamyloid.

It is white inside and does not change color when cut or bruised. The edibility of this mushroom is unknown, and it may be poisonous.
