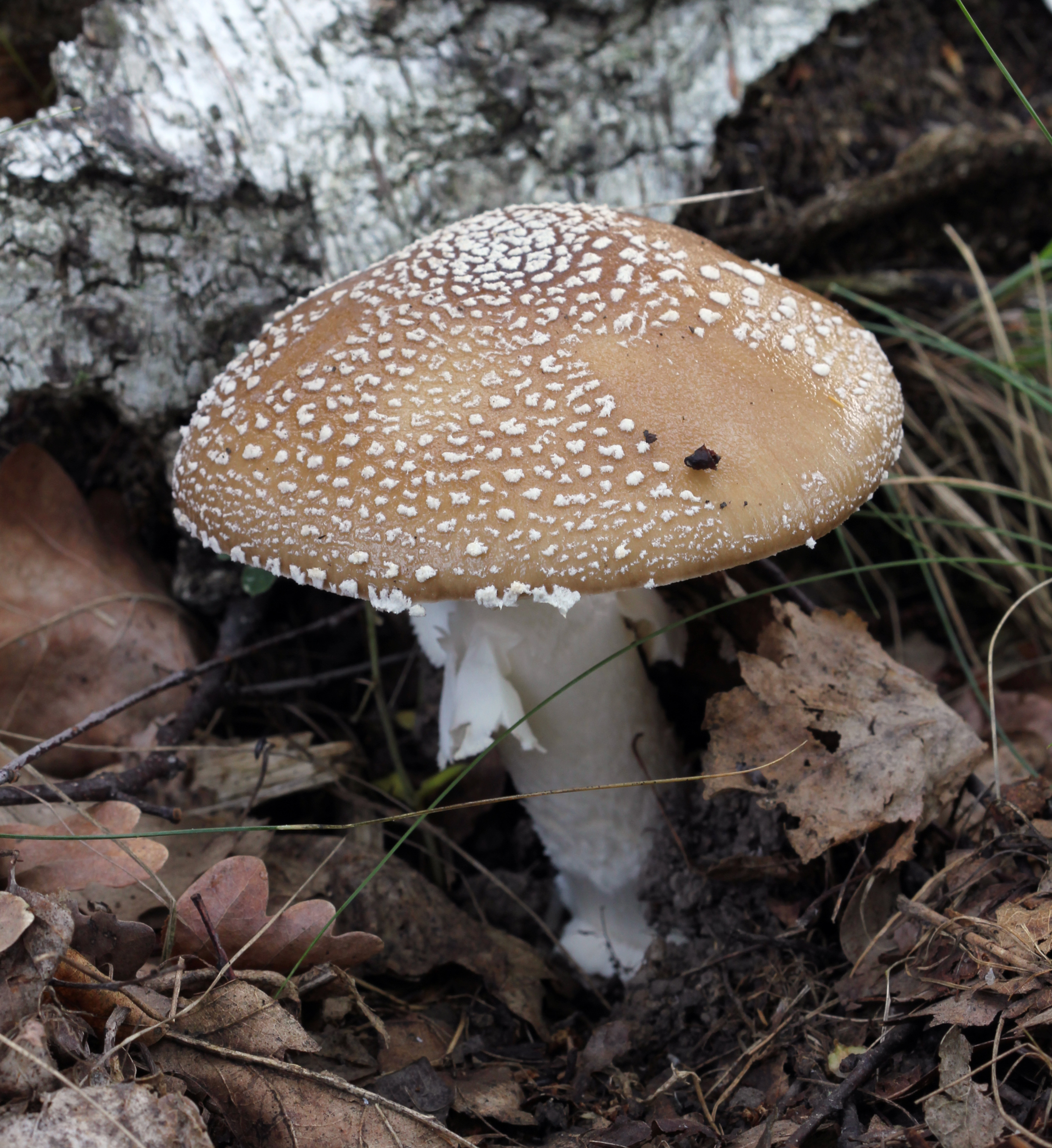

Scientific classification
- Kingdom: Fungi
- Division: Basidiomycota
- Class: Agaricomycetes
- Order: Agaricales
- Family: Amanitaceae
- Genus: Amanita
- Species: A. pantherina

Binomial name
- Amanita pantherina (DC.) Krombh. (1846)

= Amanita pantherina =

Species of fungus

Amanita pantherina
- Mycological characteristics
- Gills on hymenium
- Cap is flat
- Hymenium is free
- Stipe has a ring and volva
- Spore print is white
- Ecology is mycorrhizal
- Edibility is poisonous or psychoactive

Amanita pantherina, also known as the panther cap, false blusher, and the panther amanita due to its similarity to the true blusher (Amanita rubescens). Amanita pantherina is a species of fungus found in Eurasia, Africa, North America, and South America with poisonous and psychoactive properties.

== Description ==
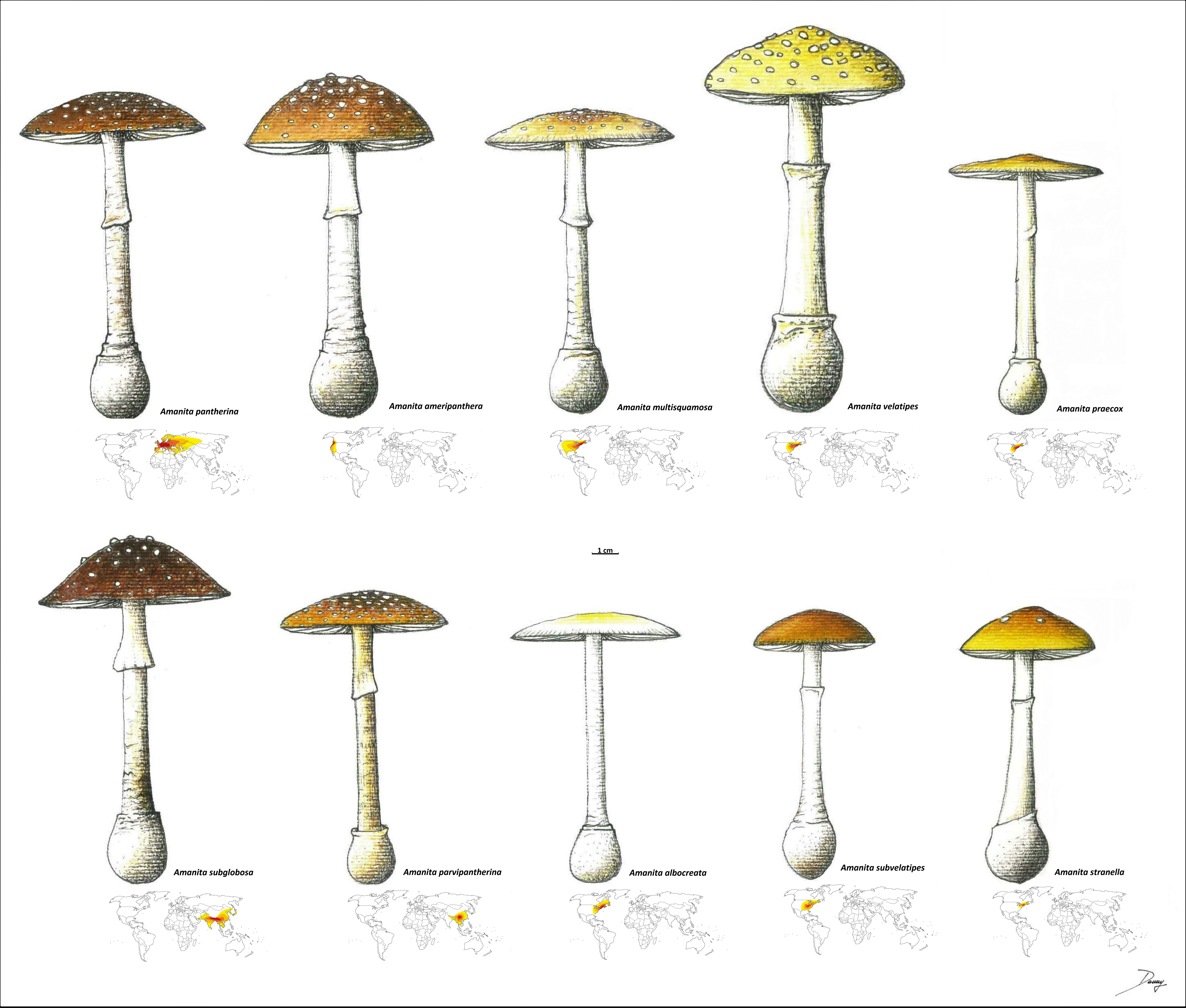
Amanita pantherina (top left) compared to closely related species

The cap is 5–18 centimetres (2–7 inches) wide, hemispheric at first, then convex to plano-convex, deep brown to hazel-brown to pale ochraceous brown, densely distributed warts that are pure white to sordid cream, minutely verruculose, floccose, easily removable. Viscid when wet, with a short striate margin. The flesh is white, unchanging when injured.

The gills are adnexed to free, close to crowded, white becoming greyish, truncate.

The spores are white in deposit, smooth, broadly ellipsoid to ellipsoid to elongate, inamyloid, infrequently globose. 8–14 x 6–10 μm.

The stipe is 5–15 cm long × .6–3 cm wide, subcylindric, somewhat narrowing upward, white, becoming slightly tannish in age, stuffed then hollow, finely floccose becoming smooth above the ring, and with small appressed squamules or creamy floccose material below. The volva is white, becoming grey with age, forming one or sometimes two narrow hoop-like rings just above the bulbous base. The flesh is white, unchanging when injured.

The odour is unpleasant or like raw potatoes.

=== Identifying features ===
Other than the brownish cap with white warts, distinguishing features of A. pantherina include the collar-like roll of volval tissue at the top of the basal bulb, and the elliptical, inamyloid spores. Unlike A. rubescens, the panther cap does not color red/pink ("blush") when the flesh is damaged, hence its name "false blusher". This is a key feature in differentiating both species.

== Distribution and habitat ==
The panther cap is an uncommon mushroom, found in both deciduous, especially beech and, less frequently, coniferous woodland and rarely meadows throughout Europe, western Asia in late summer and autumn. It has also been recorded from South Africa, where it is thought to have been accidentally introduced with trees imported from Europe and Asia.

It is an ectomycorrhizal fungus, living in root symbiosis with a tree, deriving photosynthesised nutrients from it and providing soil nutrients in return.

== Toxicity ==
A. pantherina is toxic, more so than A. muscaria. It can cause nausea, vomiting, and unconsciousness 1-3 hours after consumption. If left untreated, consuming this mushroom could be fatal. Ibotenic acid is the compound attributed to its toxicity.

== Psychoactive use ==
A. pantherina contains the psychoactive compounds ibotenic acid and muscimol, two psychoactive constituents which can cause effects such as hallucinations, synaesthesia, euphoria, dysphoria and retrograde amnesia. The effects of muscimol and ibotenic acid most closely resemble that of a Z-drug, like zolpidem at high doses, and not a classical psychedelic, e.g. psilocybin.

A. pantherina is used as an entheogen much less often than its much more distinguishable relative A. muscaria, largely due to being less recognizable and far more potent. A. muscaria contains a higher concentration of ibotenic acid. While ibotenic acid is mostly broken down by the body into muscimol, what remains of the ibotenic acid is believed to cause the majority of dysphoric effects of consuming psychoactive Amanita species. Ibotenic acid is also a scientifically important neurotoxin used in lab research as a brain-lesioning agent in mice.

As with other wild-growing mushrooms, the ratio of ibotenic acid to muscimol depends on countless external factors, including: season, age, and habitat—and percentages will naturally vary from mushroom to mushroom—with dark brown A. pantherina specimens having a greater concentration of ibotenic acid.

=== Legal status ===
A. muscaria and A. pantherina have been illegal to buy, sell, or possess in the Netherlands since December 2008. Possession of amounts larger than 0.5 g dried or 5 g fresh lead to a criminal charge.

== See also ==
- List of Amanita species

== Gallery ==
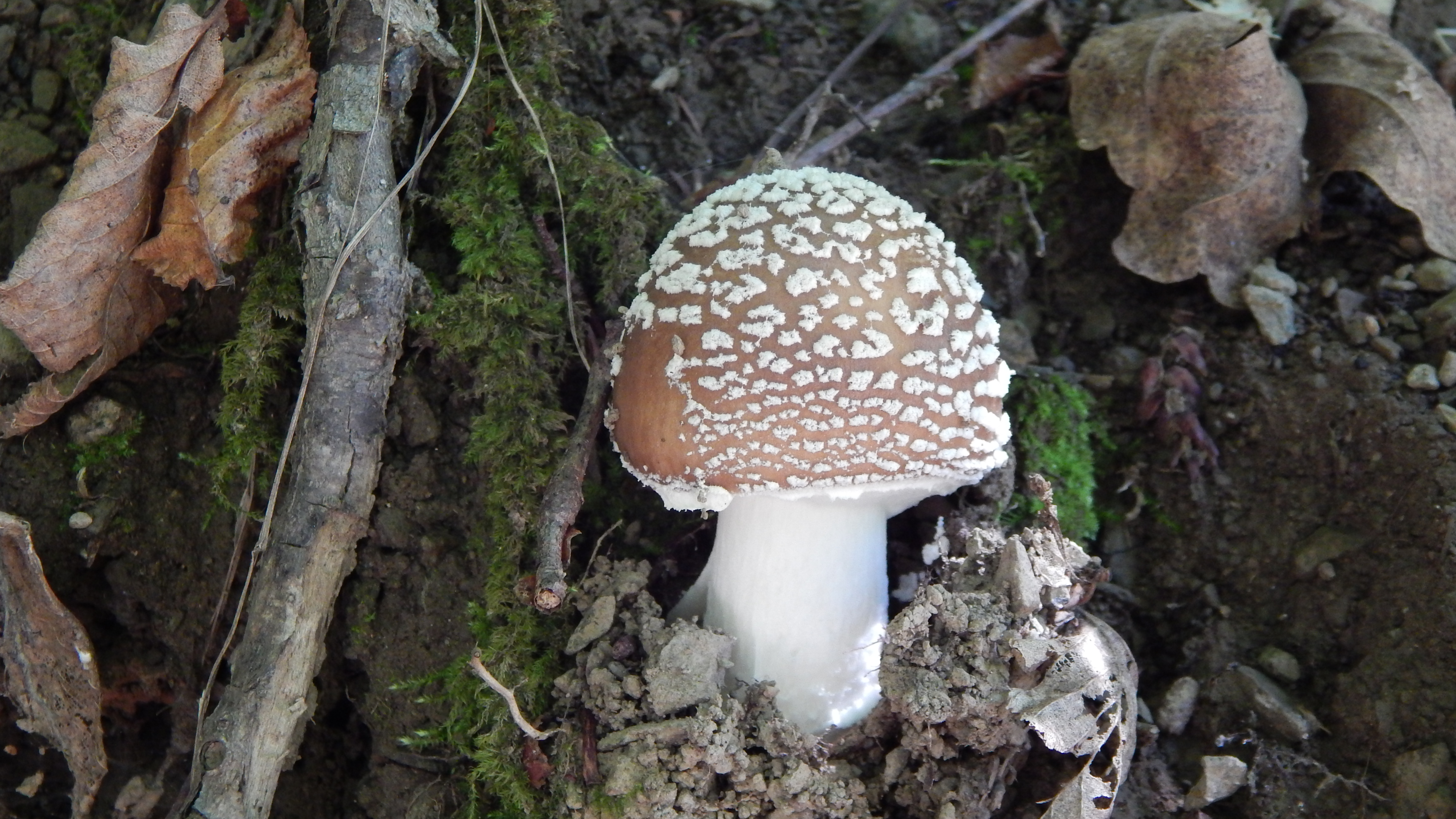

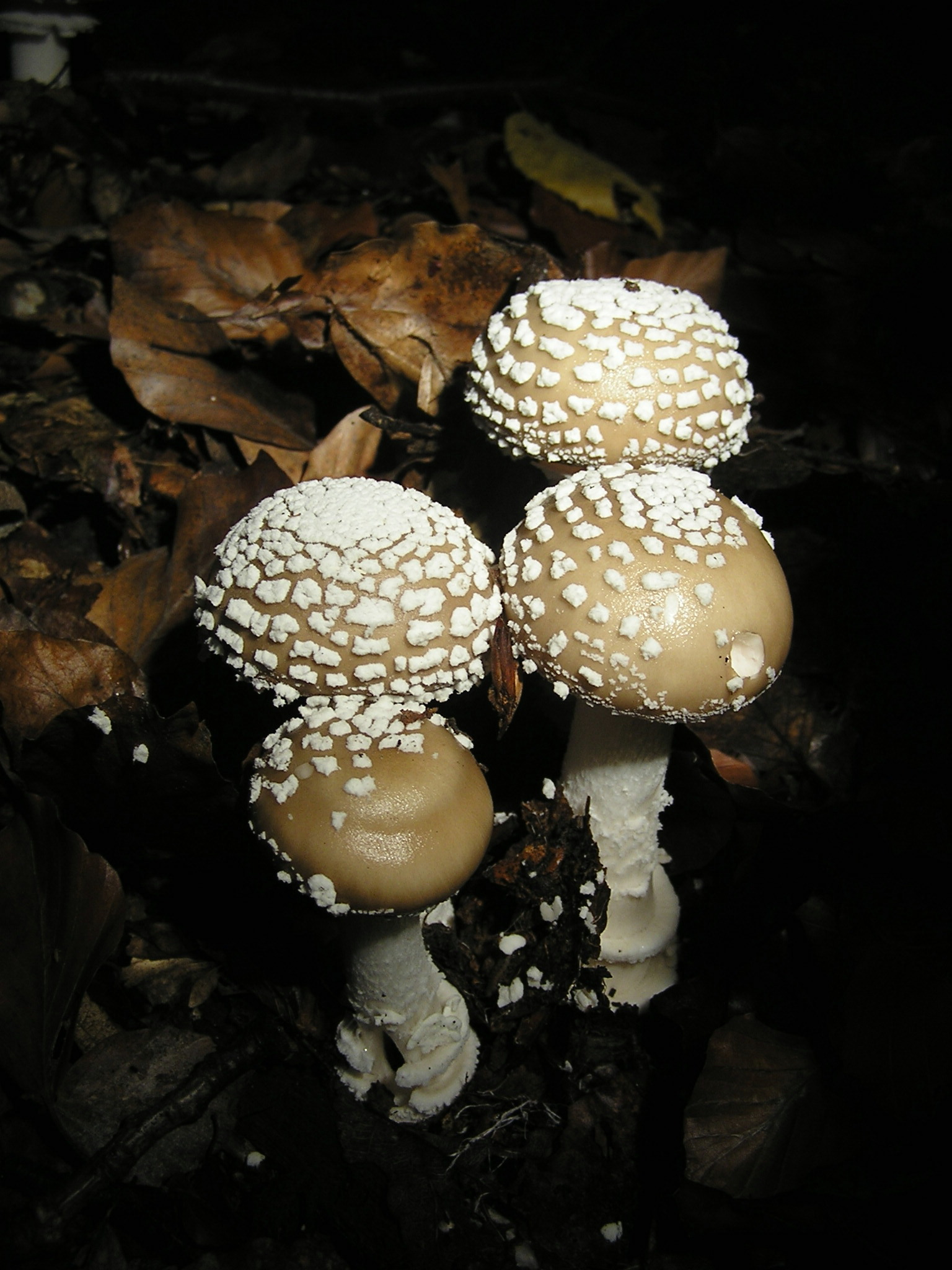

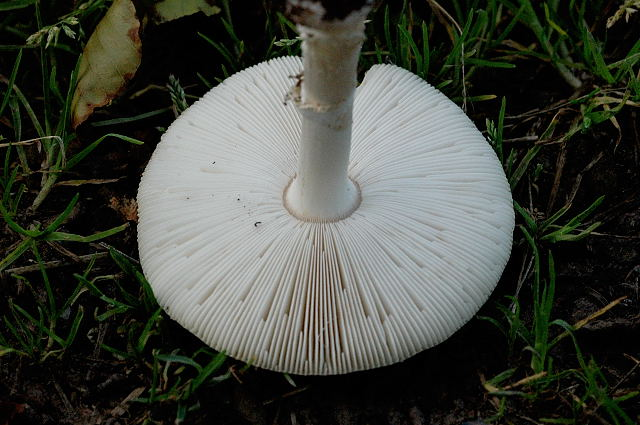

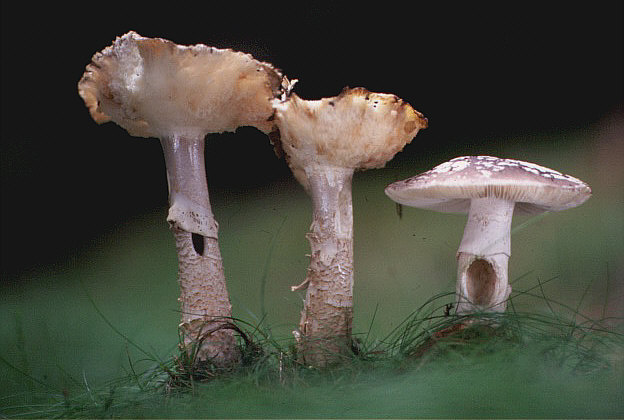

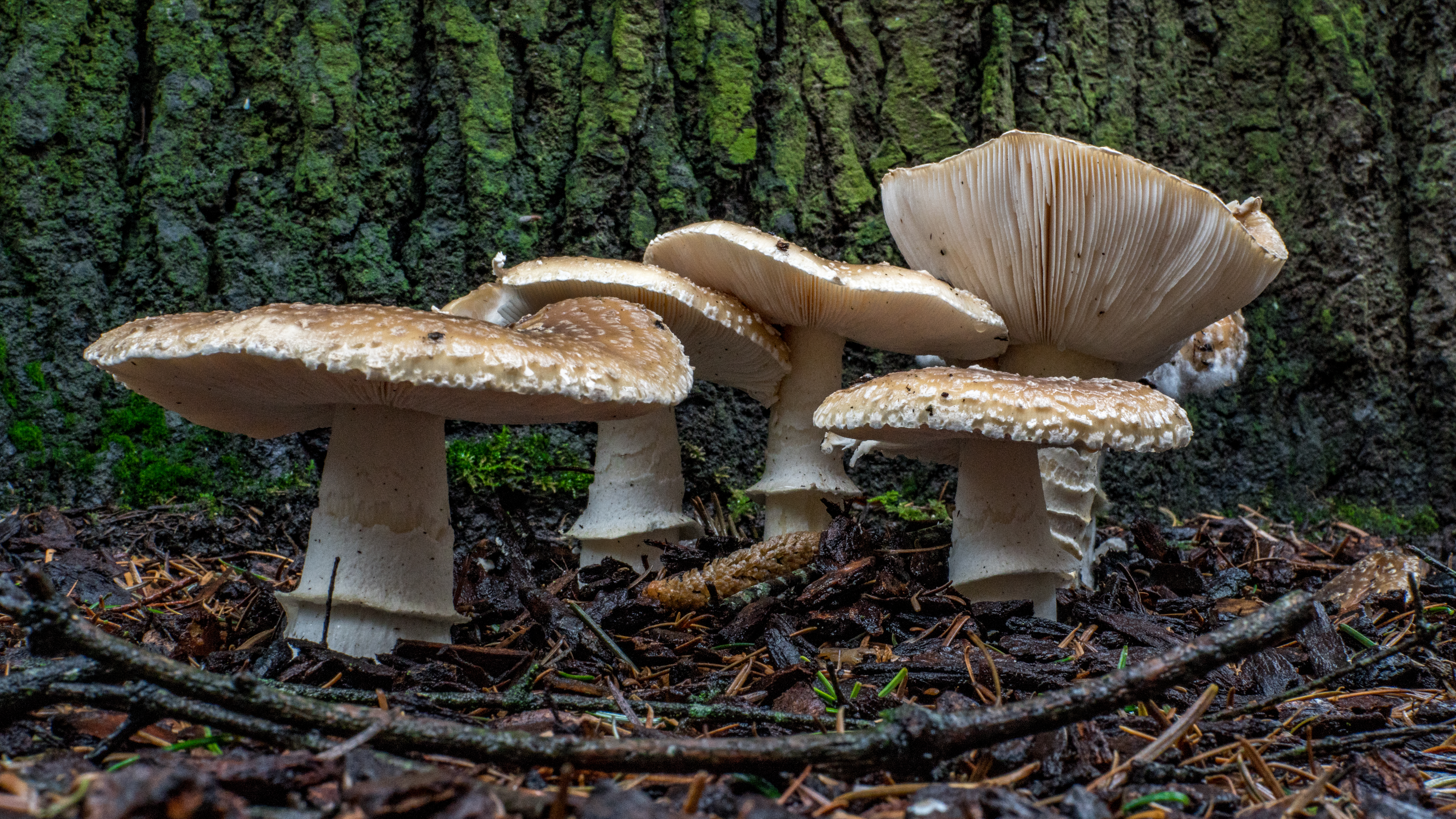
Amanita ameripathera

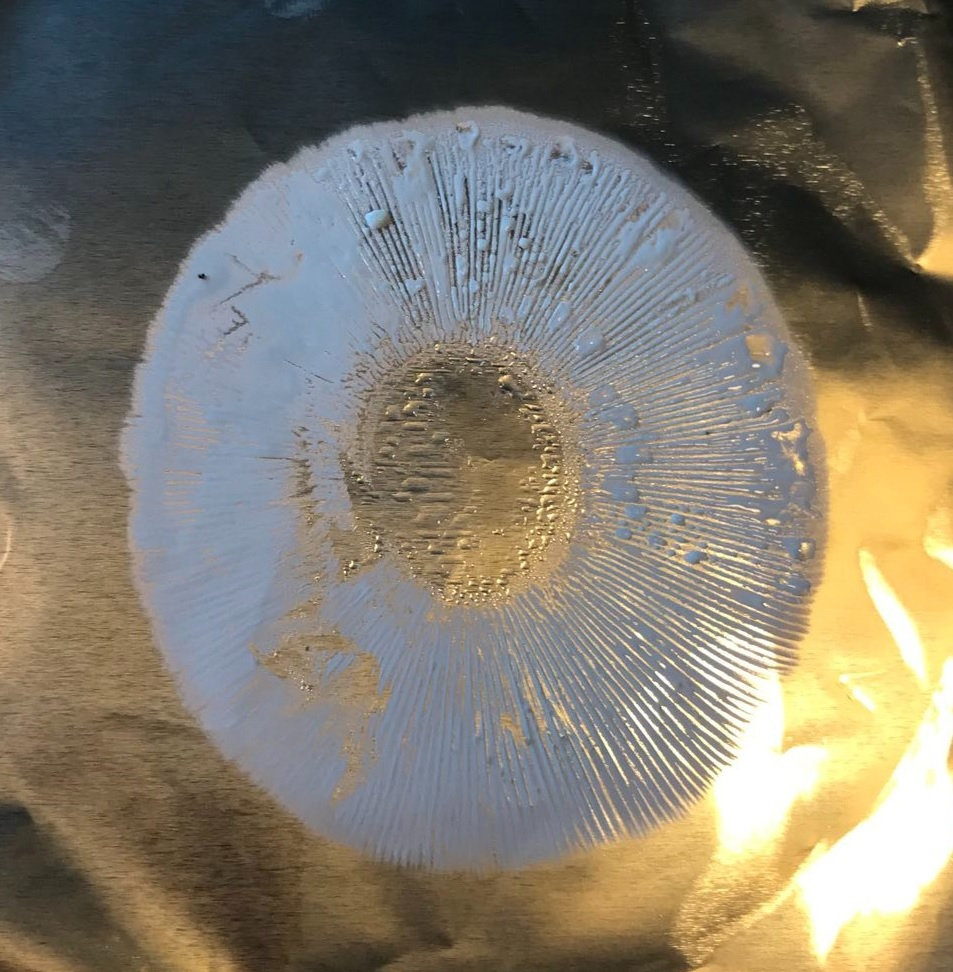
Spore print
