= List of Amanita species =

The following is a list of species of the agaric genus Amanita, one that contains over 500 named species and varieties. Building on the taxonomical outline of Amanita by Corner and Bas (1962) and Bas (1969), the subgenus and section scheme of Cui et al. (2018) is followed by this list. Bolding of the species name and an asterisk (*) following indicates the species is the type species of that section, with a double asterisk (**) indicating the type species of the entire genus. The use of common names follows Tulloss (2007), Holden (2003), Arora (1986), and Lincoff (1981). The names of the remainder of the species in the genus not assigned to subgenera by those authors are sourced from Index Fungorum and have been appended to the end of the list.

== Subgenus Amanita ==
=== Section Amanita ===
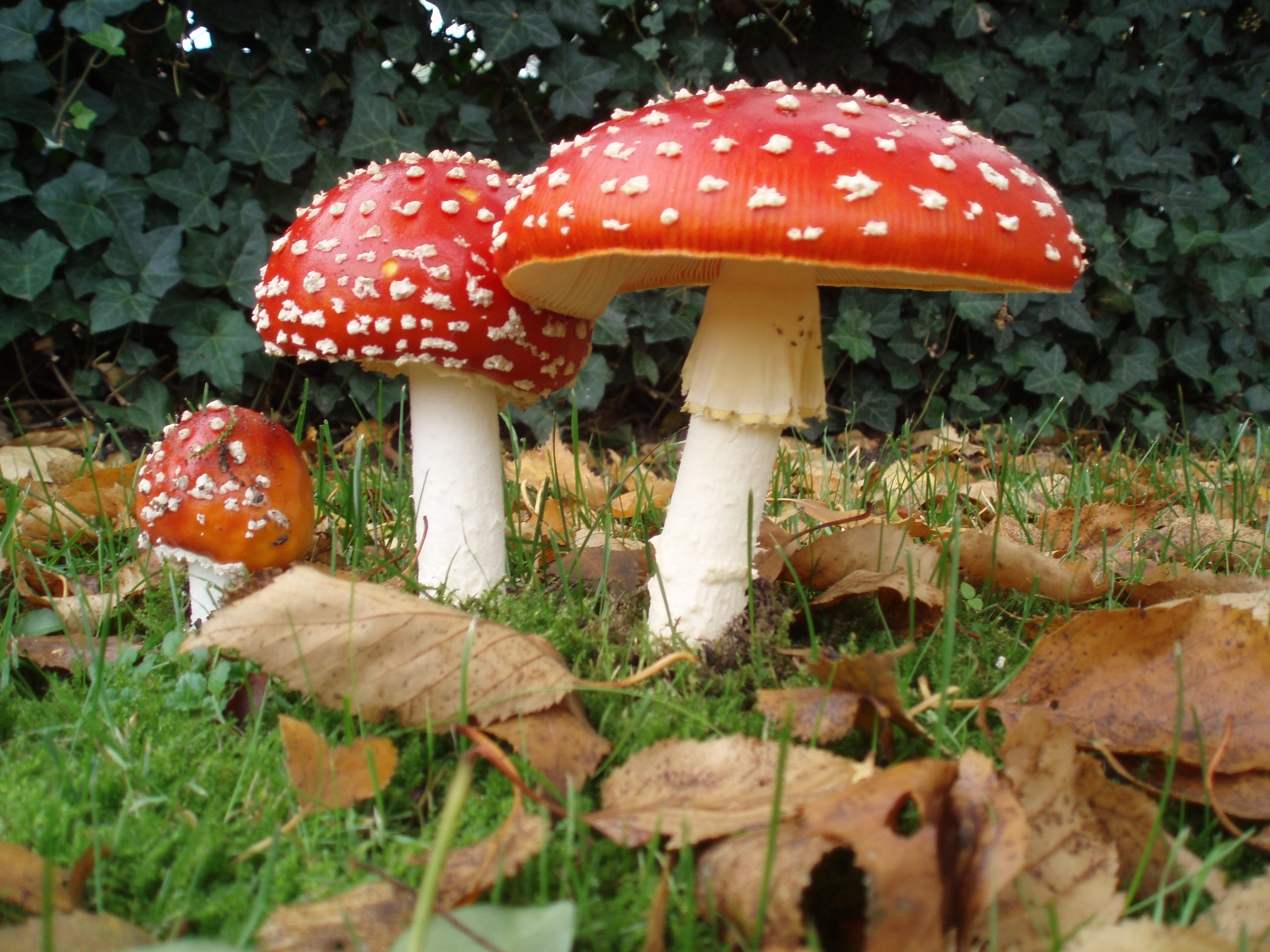
A. muscaria

- Amanita albocreata – (North America)
- Amanita albida
- Amanita aliena – (south Brazil)
- Amanita altipes – (southwestern China)
- Amanita aprica – (North America)
- Amanita armeniaca – gypsy amanita (Australia)
- Amanita augusta – USA
- Amanita breckonii – western USA
- Amanita chrysoblema
- Amanita eliae – (Europe)
- Amanita farinosa – (eastern North America to Central America)
- Amanita frostiana – Frost's amanita (eastern North America)
- Amanita gemmata – gemmed mushroom, jewelled amanita (Europe)
- Amanita gioiosa (Italy)
- Amanita ibotengutake – Japanese Ringed-Bulb Amanita, known for ibotenic acid (Japan)
- Amanita multisquamosa – Small Funnel-Veil Amanita (eastern North America)
- Amanita muscaria ** – fly agaric (cosmopolitan)
- Amanita nehuta – Maori dust Amanita (New Zealand)
- Amanita orientigemmata – (Japan)
- Amanita parcivolvata – False Caesar, False Fly Agaric
- Amanita pantherina – panther mushroom, panther cap (Northern Hemisphere)
- Amanita pantherinoides – (North America)
- Amanita parvipantherina – (Yunnan province, southwestern China)
- Amanita persicina – Peach-Colored Fly Agaric
- Amanita petalinivolva – (Brazil)
- Amanita pseudoregalis – (Europe)
- Amanita regalis – royal fly agaric (Europe, Alaska)
- Amanita roseotincta – North America
- Amanita rubrovolvata – red volva amanita (Asia)
- Amanita toxica – Lazo's Deadly Amanita
- Amanita virgineoides – white-colored (Japan)
- Amanita viscidolutea – (Brazil)
- Amanita wellsii – salmon amanita (North America)
- Amanita xanthocephala – vermillion grisette (Australia)
- Amanita xylinivolva – cottony volva amanita (US, Mexico, Costa Rica, Colombia)

=== Section Amarrendiae ===
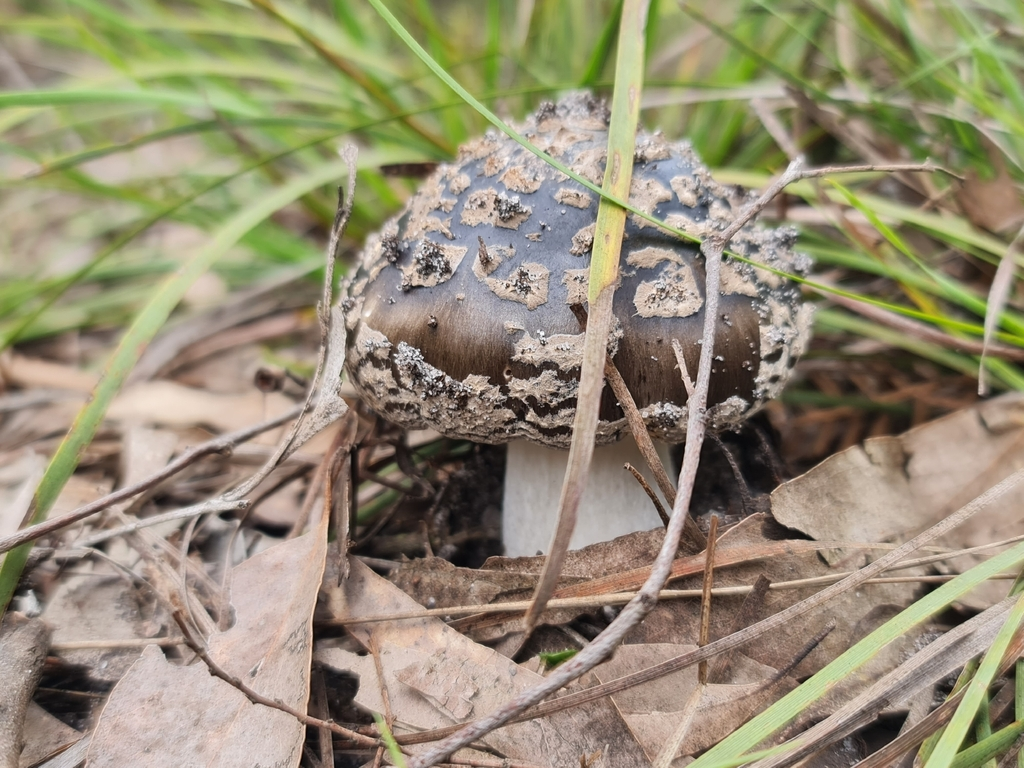
Amanita umbrinella

- Amanita galactica (South America)
- Amanita grandis (Australia)
- Amanita grandispora (Australia)
- Amanita inculta (Australia)
- Amanita merxmuelleri (South America)
- Amanita morenoi
- Amanita nigrescens (New Zealand)
- Amanita nouhrae (South America)
- Amanita oleosa
- Amanita pseudoinculta (Australia)
- Amanita umbrinella* (Australia, South American)

=== Section Caesareae ===
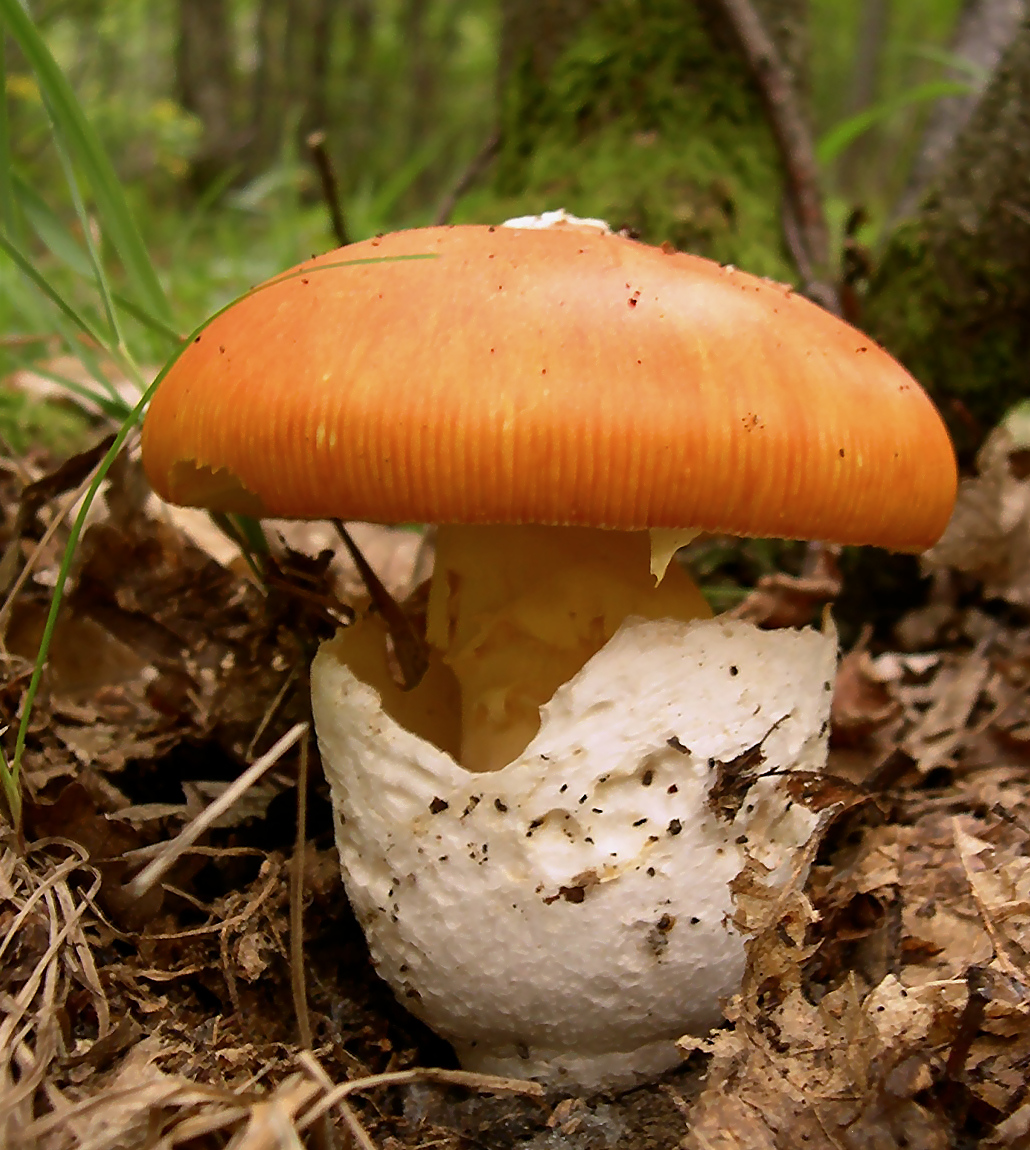
A. caesarea

- Amanita arkansana – (USA)
- Amanita basii – (Mexico)
- Amanita caesarea * – Caesar's mushroom, caesar, royal amanita (southern Europe)
- Amanita caesareoides – Asian Vermilion Slender Caesar (South-East Asia)
- Amanita calyptratoides – (Southern California)
- Amanita calyptroderma – (western North America)
- Amanita hemibapha (species complex) – half-dyed slender Caesar (Pantropical)
- Amanita jacksonii – Jackson's slender caesar, American Caesar (eastern North America)
- Amanita kitamagotake – (Asia)
- Amanita lanei (=Amanita calyptrata) – coccora, coccoli (western North America)
- Amanita princeps – head man slender Caesar (southeastern Asia)
- Amanita spreta – hated amanita, hated Caesar (eastern North America)
- Amanita yema – Yolk-Colored Caesar (Mexico)
- Amanita zambiana – Zambian slender Caesar (Africa)

=== Section Vaginatae ===
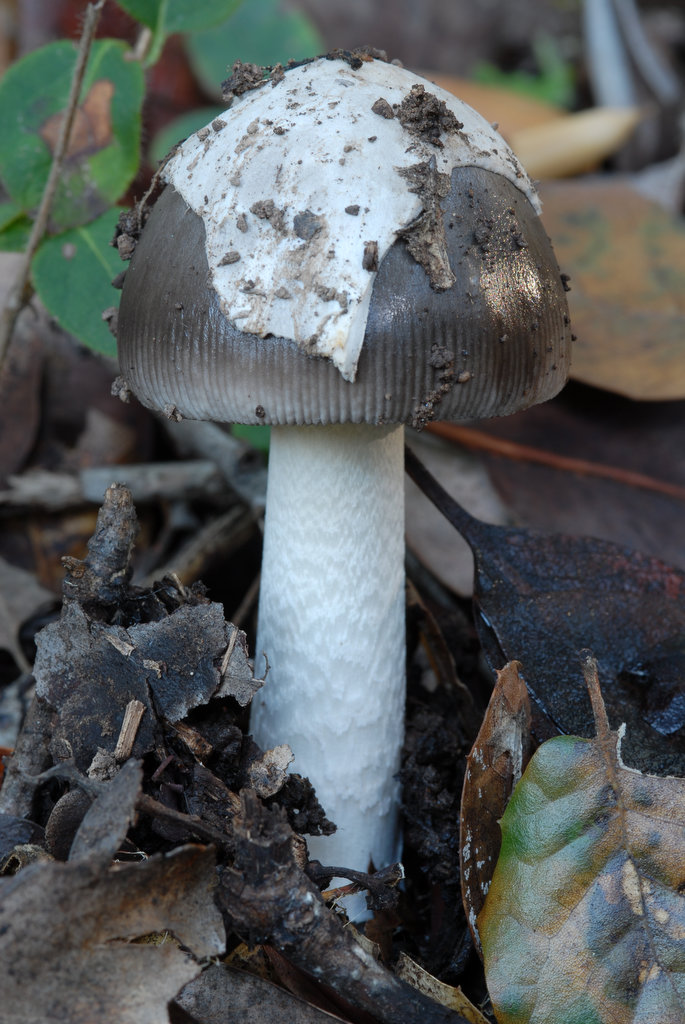
A.vaginata

- Amanita arctica (Greenland and Norway)
- Amanita arenicola – (Caribbean)
- Amanita argentea (=Amanita mairei) – René Maire's Ringless Amanita (Mediterranean basin)
- Amanita avellanea – (Europe)
- Amanita badia – (Europe)
- Amanita battarrae (=Amanita umbrinolutea) – umber-zoned ringless amanita (Europe)
- Amanita beckeri – Becker's Ringless Amanita (Europe)
- Amanita betulae (Europe)
- Amanita biovigera – (Europe)
- Amanita brunneofuliginea (=Amanita ochraceomaculata) – (Europe)
- Amanita ceciliae (=Amanita inaurata, Amanita strangulata) – Cecilia's ringless amanita, snakeskin grisette (Europe)
- Amanita contui (=Amanita flavescens) – (Europe)
- Amanita crocea – orange grisette, saffron ringless amanita (Europe)
- Amanita dryophila – (Europe)
- Amanita friabilis – (Europe)
- Amanita fuligineodisca – (from Honduras to Andean Colombia)
- Amanita fulva – tawny grisette, orange-brown ringless amanita (Europe)
- Amanita groenlandica – (Greenland and Northern Europe)
- Amanita lactea – (Europe)
- Amanita liquii – (southwestern China)
- Amanita lividopallescens – (Europe)
- Amanita magnivolvata – (Europe)
- Amanita nivalis – mountain grisette, snow ringless amanita (Arctic/Alpine)
- Amanita olivaceogrisea – (Europe)
- Amanita orientifulva – (southwestern China)
- Amanita pachycolea – Stuntz' great ringless amanita, western grisette (western North America)
- Amanita pachyvolvata – (Europe)
- Amanita pekeoides – Maori's sack ringless Amanita (New Zealand)
- Amanita protecta – (California)
- Amanita rhacopus – (North America)
- Amanita simulans (=Amanita malleata) – (Europe)
- Amanita sinicoflava – North America
- Amanita spadicea – (Europe)
- Amanita stenospora – (Europe)
- Amanita submembranacea – (Europe)
- Amanita subnudipes – (Europe)
- Amanita vaginata * – grisette (Europe, North America)
- Amanita velosa – springtime amanita, coral to peachy pink ringless amanita (western North America)

== Subgenus Amanitina ==
=== Section Phalloideae ===
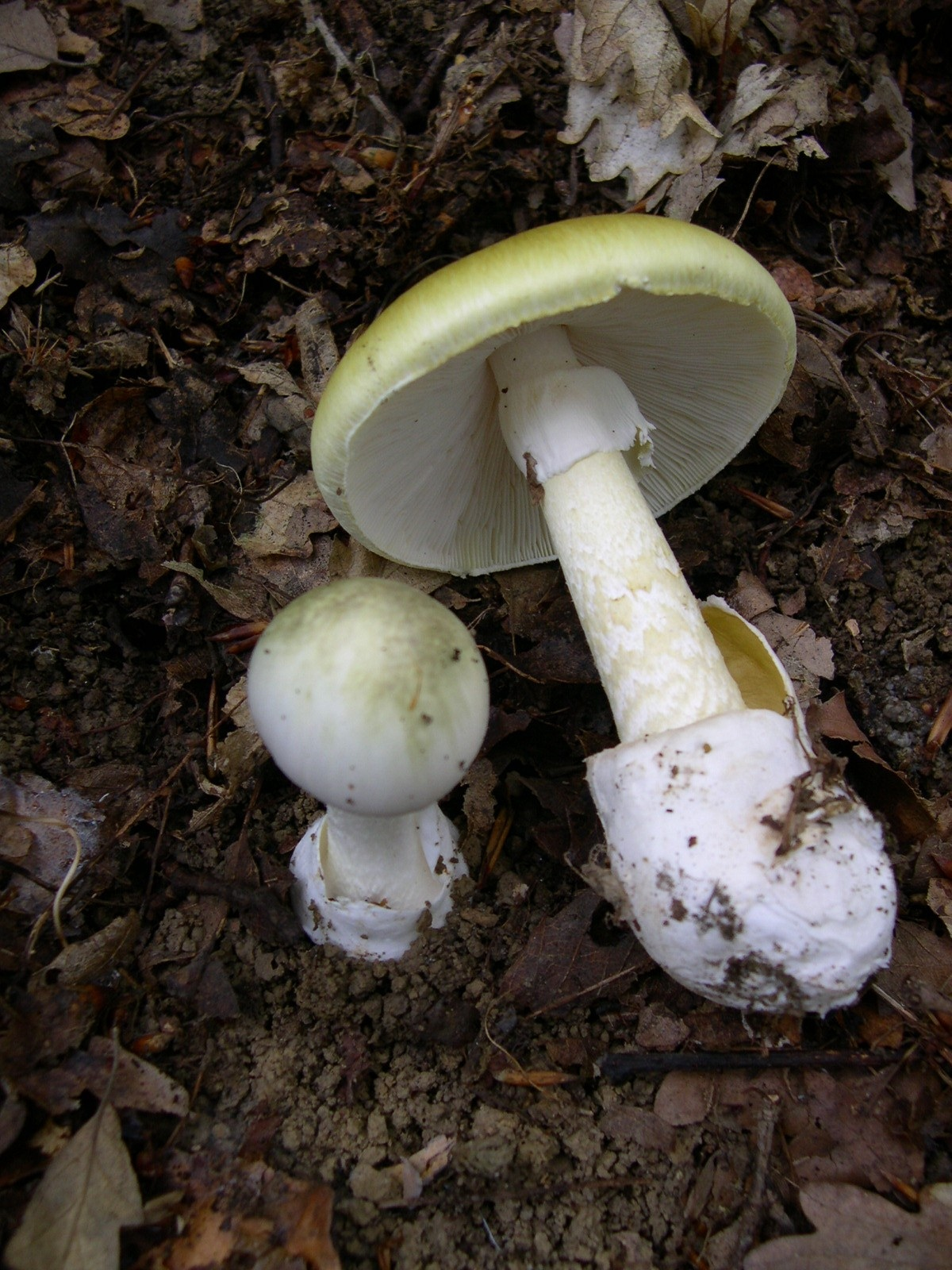
A. phalloides

- Amanita amerivirosa – Destroying Angel (eastern North America, Mediterranean)
- Amanita arocheae – Latin American death cap (Central/South America)
- Amanita bisporigera – destroying angel (eastern North America)
- Amanita bweyeyensis
- Amanita elliptosperma – Atkinson's Destroying Angel (North America)
- Amanita exitialis – Guangzhou destroying angel (southern China)
- Amanita fuliginea – East Asian Brown Death Cap (Japan, China)
- Amanita gayana – Gay's Death Cap
- Amanita griseorosea
- Amanita hesleri – Hesler's Lepidella (eastern North America)
- Amanita harkoneniana
- Amanita hygroscopica Coker – "Pink-Gilled Destroying Angel," possibly synonymous with Amanita elliptosperma
- Amanita magnivelaris – great felt skirt destroying angel (eastern North America)
- Amanita marmorata
  - Amanita marmorata subsp. myrtacearum – marbled death cap (Hawaii)
- Amanita molliuscula (China)
- Amanita ocreata – destroying angel, death angel (western North America)
- Amanita pallidorosea (China)
- Amanita parviexitialis (Southern China)
- Amanita phalloides * – death cap (cosmopolitan)
- Amanita porrinensis – (Spain and Italy)
- Amanita rimosa
- Amanita suballiacea (North America)
- Amanita subfuliginea (China)
- Amanita subjunquillea – east Asian death cap (East & Southeast Asia)
- Amanita subpallidorosea
- Amanita veldiei – Veldie's Lepidella (South Africa)
- Amanita verna – fool's mushroom (southern Europe)
- Amanita virosa – destroying angel (Europe)
- Amanita virosiformis – narrow-spored destroying angel (Florida)
- Amanita volvarielloides – (Australia)

=== Section Arenariae ===
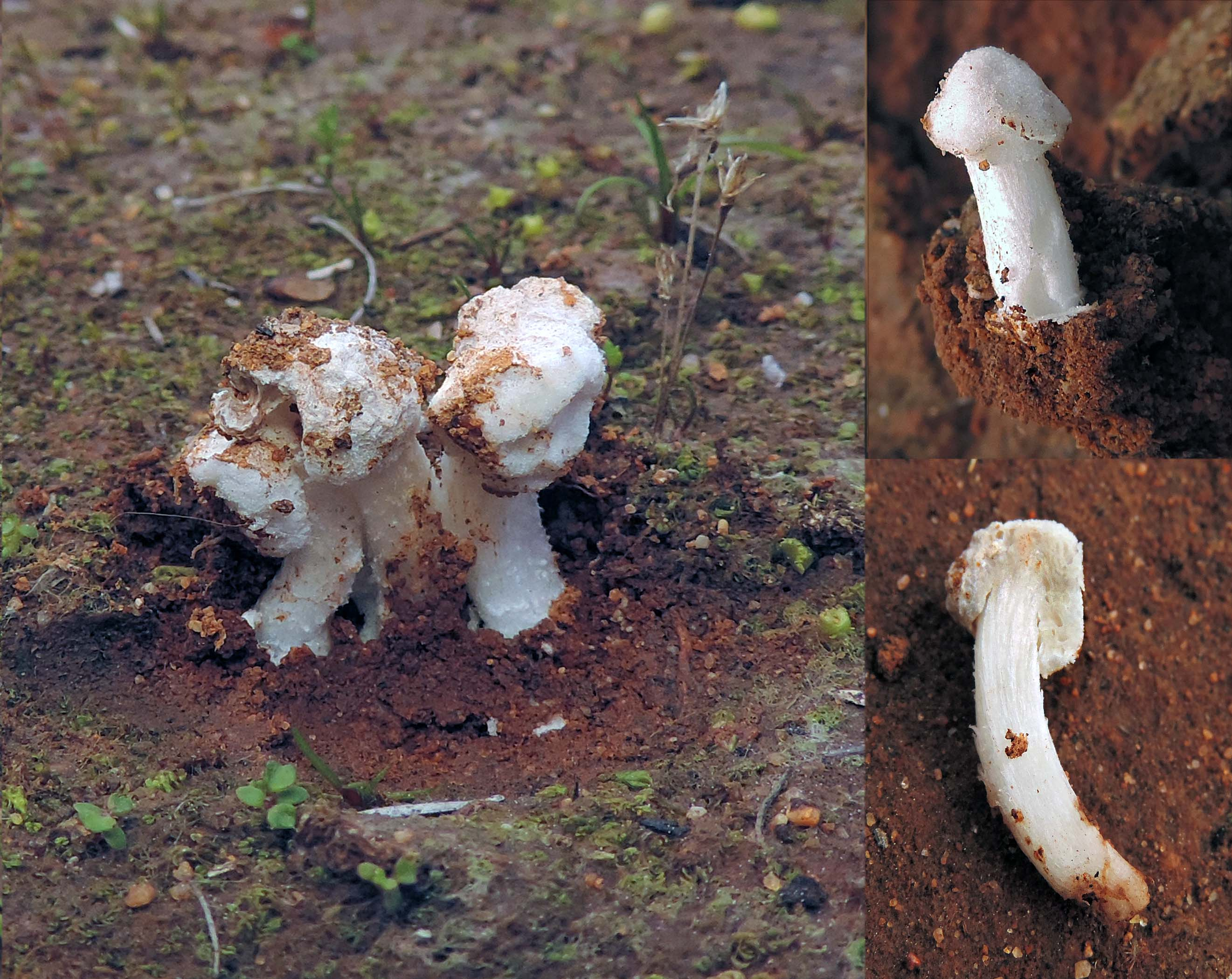
Amanita arenaria

- Amanita arenaria * (Australia)
- Amanita arenarioides (Australia)
- Amanita compacta
- Amanita griselloides
- Amanita peltigera
- Amanita pseudoarenaria
- Amanita pupatuju
- Amanita sabulosa

=== Section Validae ===
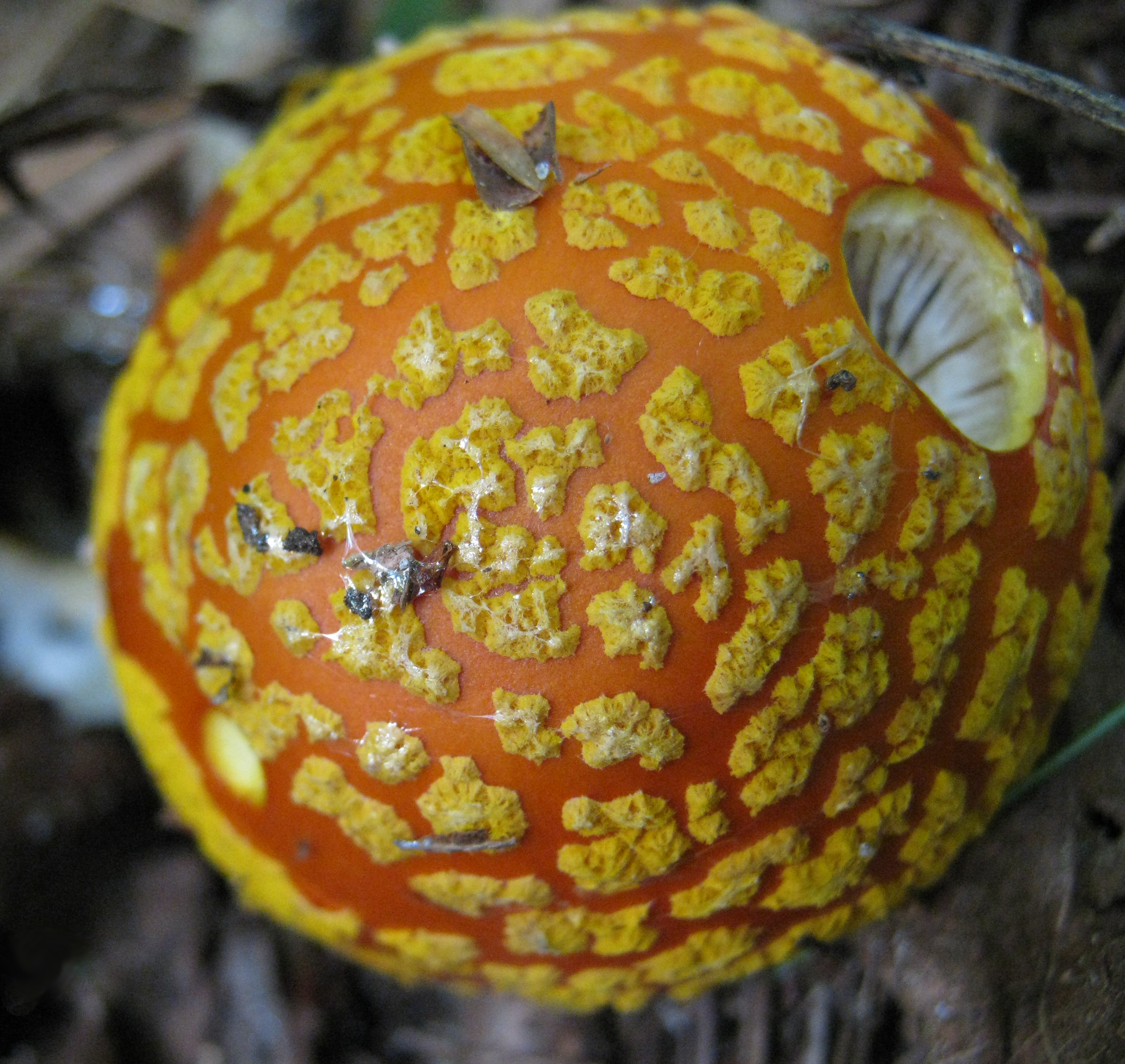
A. flavoconia

- Amanita aestivalis – white American star-footed Amanita (North America)
- Amanita asteropus (Europe)
- Amanita australis – far south Amanita (New Zealand)
- Amanita brunneolocularis – Mesoamerican Dark Volva Blusher (Colombia, Costa Rica, Honduras)
- Amanita brunnescens – brown American star-footed Amanita, cleft-footed amanita (North America)
- Amanita canescens – Golden Threads Lepidella (North America)
- Amanita citrina – false death cap (Europe)
- Amanita elongata – Peck's Yellow Dust Amanita
- Amanita excelsa *
  - Amanita excelsa var. excelsa (=Amanita excelsa var. valida) – (Europe)
  - Amanita excelsa var. spissa (=Amanita spissa) – grey-spotted amanita, European false blusher (Europe)
- Amanita flavella – orange Amanita, Australian yellow-dust amanita (Australia)
- Amanita flavipes
- Amanita flavoconia – yellow patches, yellow wart, American yellow-dust amanita (eastern North America)
- Amanita franchetii (= Amanita aspera) – yellow-veiled amanita (Europe, North America)
- Amanita intermedia (Italy)
- Amanita luteofusca – Thorn-Bush Amanita (Australia)
- Amanita nothofagi – southern beech Amanita (New Zealand)
- Amanita novinupta – western blusher, blushing bride (western North America)
- Amanita porphyria – purple-brown Amanita, porphyry amanita (Europe)
- Amanita rubescens – European blusher, golmotte (Europe)
- Amanita solaniolens – old potato amanita (Nova Scotia, Canada)

=== Section Strobiliformes ===
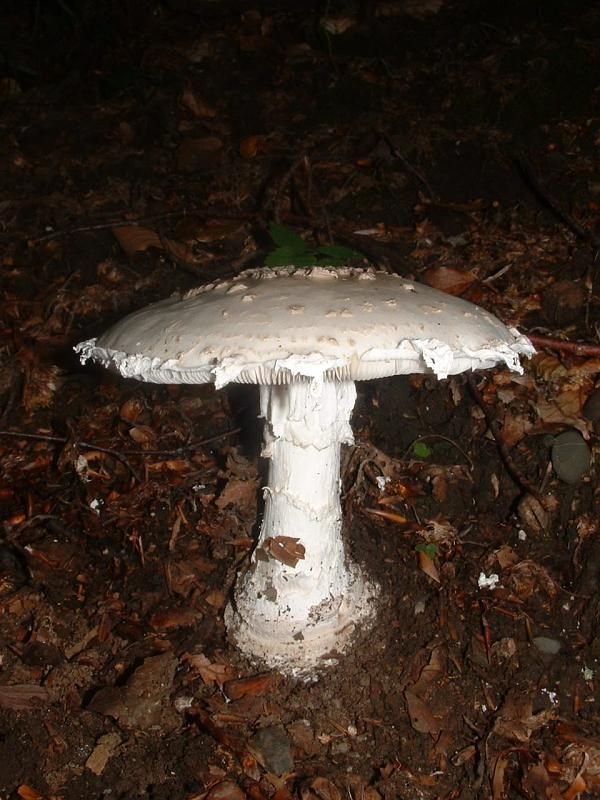
Amanita strobiliformis

- Amanita aspericeps
- Amanita cinereopannosa
- Amanita griseoverrucosa
- Amanita ravenelii – pinecone lepidella (North America)
- Amanita strobiliformis * – warted amanita (Europe)

=== Section Amidella ===
- Amanita avellaneosquamosa
- Amanita brunneomaculata
- Amanita clarisquamosa
- Amanita curtipes or Amanita baccata – (southern Europe)
- Amanita gilbertii – (France & Germany)
- Amanita lanigera
- Amanita lepiotoides – (southern Europe)
- Amanita parvicurta
- Amanita pinophila
- Amanita ponderosa – (southern Europe)
- Amanita proxima – (southern Europe)
- Amanita rufobrunnescens
- Amanita valens – (southern Europe)
- Amanita volvata * – American amidella (eastern North America)

=== Section Roanokenses ===
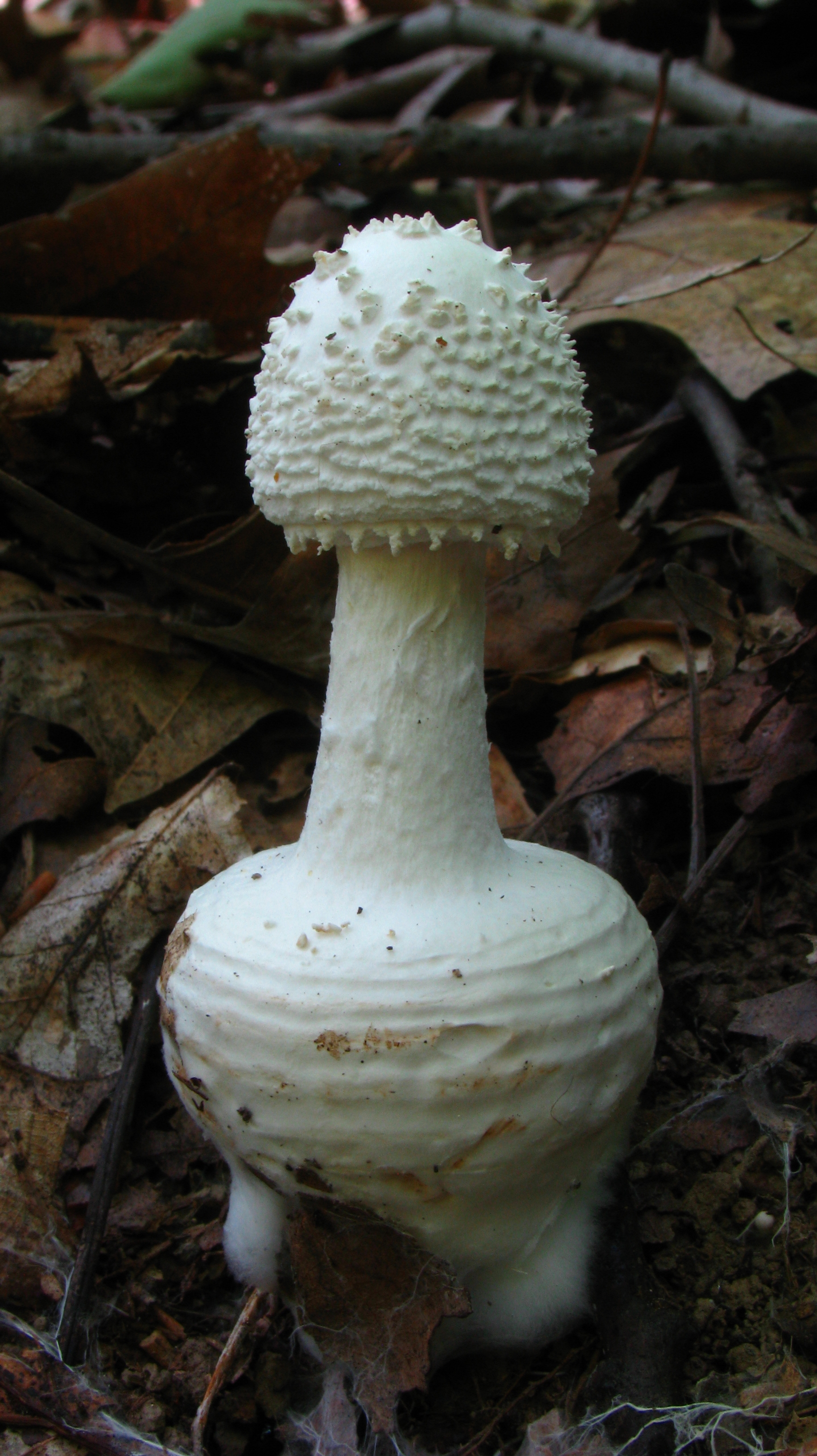
A. abrupta

- Amanita abrupta – American abrupt-bulbed Lepidella (North America)
- Amanita atkinsoniana
- Amanita ananiceps – White-veiled Lepidella, Australian pineapple Lepidella (Australia)
- Amanita austroviridis (Australia) – Australian verdigris Lepidella
- Amanita boudieri (Europe)
- Amanita caojizong – Chiu's false death cap (East Asia, Thailand)
- Amanita carneiphylla
- Amanita chlorinosma – Chlorine Lepidella (eastern North America)
- Amanita cinereovelata – northern Bangladesh
- Amanita cokeri – Coker's Lepidella
- Amanita daucipes – Carrot-foot Lepidella, turnip-foot Amanita
- Amanita gracilior (Europe)
- Amanita kotohiraensis – Kotohira Lepidella
- Amanita lesueurii – Lesueur's Lepidella (southwestern Australia)
- Amanita longipes – Dog-Legged Lepidella
- Amanita macrocarpa – South China
- Amanita magniverrucata – Great-warted Lepidella
- Amanita manginiana – Mangin's false death cap (East Asia)
- Amanita mutabilis – Anise And Raspberry Limbed-Lepidell
- Amanita neo-ovoidea – (Asia)
- Amanita oberwinkleriana
- Amanita ochrophylla
- Amanita ochrophylloides
- Amanita onusta – Loaded Lepidella, gunpowder Lepidella
- Amanita polypyramis
- Amanita pseudoporphyria – Hongo's false death cap (East & South Asia)
- Amanita pyramidifera – Pyramid Builder Lepidella (Australia)
- Amanita rhopalopus – (North America) American Club-Footed Lepidella
- Amanita roanokensis *
- Amanita sculpta
- Amanita smithiana – Smith's Lepidella (western North America)
- Amanita sphaerobulbosa – Asian abrupt-bulbed Lepidella (eastern Asia)
- Amanita westii

== Subgenus Lepidella (= Saproamanita) ==
=== Section Lepidella (= Saproamanita) ===
- Amanita advena
- Amanita codinae (Europe, Middle East)
- Amanita inopinata – Unexpected Guest Lepidella (New Zealand, western Europe)
- Amanita nauseosa
- Amanita prairiicola – American Prairie Lepidella
- Amanita singeri (southern Europe)
- Amanita thiersii – Thiers' Lepidella (eastern North America)
- Amanita vittadinii * – Barefoot Amanita, Vittadini's Lepidella (southern Europe)

== Subgenus unknown ==
- Amanita abruptiformis
- Amanita afrospinosa
- Amanita agglutinata
- Amanita ahmadii
- Amanita alauda
- Amanita albidannulata
- Amanita albidoides
- Amanita albidostipes
- Amanita albofimbriata
- Amanita alboflavescens
- Amanita albogrisescens
- Amanita albolimbata
- Amanita albopulverulenta
- Amanita alboradicata
- Amanita albosquamosa
- Amanita alboumbelliformis
- Amanita alboverrucosa
- Amanita alexandri
- Amanita alliacea
- Amanita alliodora
- Amanita allostraminea
- Amanita alpinicola
- Amanita alseides
- Amanita altifissura
- Amanita alutacea
- Amanita amanitoides
- Amanita ameghinoi
- Amanita amerivirosa
- Amanita aminoaliphatica
- Amanita ananicipitoides
- Amanita angustilamellata
- Amanita angustispora
- Amanita anisata
- Amanita annulalbida
- Amanita annulata
- Amanita annulatovaginata
- Amanita antillana
- Amanita aporema
- Amanita areolata
- Amanita argenteoalba
- Amanita armillariiformis
- Amanita asperoides
- Amanita atrobrunnea
- Amanita atrofusca
- Amanita aurantiobrunnea
- Amanita aurantiovelata
- Amanita aurantisquamosa
- Amanita aurea
- Amanita aureomonile
- Amanita aurora
- Amanita austrobulbosa
- Amanita austro-olivacea
- Amanita austrophalloides
- Amanita austropulchella
- Amanita austrostraminea
- Amanita avellaneifolia
- Amanita ballerina
- Amanita bambra
- Amanita basiana
- Amanita basibulbosa
- Amanita basiorubra
- Amanita beillei
- Amanita bella
- Amanita berkeleyi
- Amanita bertaultii
- Amanita bharatensis
- Amanita bicolor
- Amanita bingensis
- Amanita bivolvata
- Amanita borneensis
- Amanita bresadolana
- Amanita brunneistriatula
- Amanita brunneoconulus
- Amanita brunneofolia
- Amanita brunneolimbata
- Amanita brunneoprocera
- Amanita brunneosquamata
- Amanita brunneitoxicaria
- Amanita brunneostrobilipes
- Amanita brunneoumbonata
- Amanita calabarica
- Amanita calochroa
- Amanita campinaranae
- Amanita castanea
- Amanita castanopsidis
- Amanita centunculus
- Amanita changtuia
- Amanita chatamagotake
- Amanita cheelii
- Amanita chepangiana
- Amanita chevalleri
- Amanita chiui
- Amanita chlorophylla
- Amanita chocoana
- Amanita chrysoleuca
- Amanita chuformis
- Amanita cinctipes
- Amanita cinerascens
- Amanita cinereoannulosa
- Amanita cinereocarpa
- Amanita cinereoradicata
- Amanita cingulata
- Amanita cinis
- Amanita cinnamomea
- Amanita circinata
- Amanita circulata
- Amanita cistetorum
- Amanita citrinoannulata
- Amanita citrinoindusiata
- Amanita clarae
- Amanita clelandii
- Amanita coacta
- Amanita cokeriana
- Amanita colombiana
- Amanita conara
- Amanita concentrica
- Amanita congolensis
- Amanita conicobulbosa
- Amanita conicogrisea
- Amanita conicoverrucosa
- Amanita constricta
- Amanita cordae
- Amanita cornelii
- Amanita corticelli
- Amanita coryli
- Amanita costaricensis
- Amanita cothurnata
- Amanita craseoderma
- Amanita crassa
- Amanita crassifoliata
- Amanita crassipes
- Amanita crassivolata
- Amanita crebresulcata
- Amanita crematelloides
- Amanita crenulata
- Amanita cruzii
- Amanita cryptoleuca
- Amanita curta
- Amanita cyanochlorinosma
- Amanita cyanopus
- Amanita cylindrispora
- Amanita cylindrisporiformis
- Amanita cystidiosa
- Amanita decipiens
- Amanita demissa
- Amanita detersa
- Amanita dhakuriana
- Amanita diemii
- Amanita digitosa
- Amanita djarilmari
- Amanita dolichosporus
- Amanita domingensis
- Amanita drummondii
- Amanita dulciodora
- Amanita dunensis
- Amanita dunicola
- Amanita duplex
- Amanita dyschromatus
- Amanita eburnea
- Amanita echinocephala
- Amanita echinulata
- Amanita effusa
- Amanita egregia
- Amanita egreginus
- Amanita eijii
- Amanita elata
- Amanita electra
- Amanita elegans
- Amanita elephas
- Amanita elliptica
- Amanita elongatospora
- Amanita emodotrygon
- Amanita eriophora
- Amanita erythrocephala
- Amanita esculenta
- Amanita eucalypti
- Amanita exilis
- Amanita farinacea
- Amanita fense
- Amanita fibrillopes
- Amanita fibrilosa
- Amanita flaccida
- Amanita flammeola
- Amanita flavidocerea
- Amanita flavidogrisea
- Amanita flaviphylla
- Amanita flavivolva
- Amanita flavoalba
- Amanita flavofloccosa
- Amanita flavogala
- Amanita flavopantherina
- Amanita flavorubescens
- Amanita flavosquamosa
- Amanita floccocephala
- Amanita floccosolivida
- Amanita floridana
- Amanita foetidissima
- Amanita formicaria
- Amanita forrestiae
- Amanita franzii
- Amanita fraterna
- Amanita fritillaria
- Amanita fuligineoides
- Amanita fuliginosa
- Amanita fulvaurantia
- Amanita fulvoalba
- Amanita fulvoides
- Amanita fulvopulverulenta
- Amanita fulvopyramidalis
- Amanita fulvosquamulosa
- Amanita fuscobrunnea
- Amanita fuscoflava
- Amanita fuscosquamosa
- Amanita fuscostriata
- Amanita garabitoana
- Amanita gardneri
- Amanita glabriceps
- Amanita glarea
- Amanita gloeocystidiosa
- Amanita glutinosa
- Amanita godeyi
- Amanita goossensfontanae
- Amanita goossensiae
- Amanita gossypinoannulata
- Amanita gracilenta
- Amanita grallipes
- Amanita granulata
- Amanita grauiana
- Amanita grisea
- Amanita grisella
- Amanita griseobrunnea
- Amanita griseoconia
- Amanita griseofarinosa
- Amanita griseofusca
- Amanita griseopantherina
- Amanita griseostrobilacea
- Amanita griseoturcosa
- Amanita griseoumbonata
- Amanita griseovelata
- Amanita grossa
- Amanita guyanensis
- Amanita guzmanii
- Amanita gwyniana
- Amanita gymnopus
- Amanita hamadae
- Amanita hayalyuy
- Amanita heishidingensis
- Amanita helianthemicola
- Amanita herrerae
- Amanita heterochroma
- Amanita hiltonii
- Amanita hongoi
- Amanita hortorius
- Amanita hovae
- Amanita huijsmanii
- Amanita humboldtii
- Amanita hunanensis
- Amanita illudens
- Amanita imazekii
- Amanita incarnatifolia
- Amanita inentricus
- Amanita indica
- Amanita infusca
- Amanita ingrata
- Amanita ingwa
- Amanita innatifibrilla
- Amanita inodora
- Amanita inopinata
- Amanita inzengae
- Amanita irreperta
- Amanita islandica
- Amanita jacoblangei
- Amanita japonica
- Amanita javanica
- Amanita kalamundae
- Amanita kammala
- Amanita karea
- Amanita komarekensis
- Amanita konkanensis
- Amanita kwangsiensis
- Amanita labordei
- Amanita lanivolva
- Amanita lanosa
- Amanita lanosula
- Amanita laurae
- Amanita lavendula
- Amanita levistriata
- Amanita lignitincta
- Amanita lignophila
- Amanita lilloi
- Amanita limbatula
- Amanita lippiae
- Amanita longistriata
- Amanita longitibiale
- Amanita loosei
- Amanita lusitanica
- Amanita luteivolvata
- Amanita luteoflava
- Amanita luteofolia
- Amanita luteolamellata
- Amanita luteolovelata
- Amanita luteoparva
- Amanita lutescens
- Amanita macrospora
- Amanita madagascariensis
- Amanita mafingensis
- Amanita malayensis
- Amanita malheurensis
- Amanita malodora
- Amanita mammosa
- Amanita manicata
- Amanita manilensis
- Amanita mansehraensis
- Amanita margarita
- Amanita marginata
- Amanita masasiensis
- Amanita mcalpineana
- Amanita media
- Amanita melleialba
- Amanita melleiceps
- Amanita microlepis
- Amanita microspora
- Amanita miculifera
- Amanita millsii
- Amanita minima
- Amanita minutisquama
- Amanita miomboensis
- Amanita mira
- Amanita modesta
- Amanita morrisii
- Amanita mortenii
- Amanita multicingulata
- Amanita mumura
- Amanita murinacea
- Amanita murinaster
- Amanita muriniflammea
- Amanita murrilliana
- Amanita muscoides
- Amanita nana
- Amanita neglecta
- Amanita neocinctipes
- Amanita neomurina
- Amanita neoneglecta
- Amanita oblongospora
- Amanita obsita
- Amanita occidentalis
- Amanita ochracea
- Amanita ochraceobulbosa
- Amanita ochroterrea
- Amanita odorata
- Amanita odorifera
- Amanita olivacea
- Amanita olivaceobrunnea
- Amanita olivaceofusca
- Amanita olivovaginata
- Amanita oreina
- Amanita orientalis
- Amanita orienticrocea
- Amanita orientisororia
- Amanita orsonii
- Amanita ovalispora
- Amanita ovoidea – bearded amanita, European egg amidella (southern Europe)
- Amanita pachysperma
- Amanita pagetodes
- Amanita pakistanica
- Amanita pallidobrunnea
- Amanita pallidocarnea
- Amanita pallidochlorotica
- Amanita pallidochracea
- Amanita pallidoflavescens
- Amanita pallidofumosa
- Amanita pallidogrisea
- Amanita pallidozonata
- Amanita paludosa
- Amanita pannosa
- Amanita pareparina
- Amanita parva
- Amanita parviformis
- Amanita parvifritillaria
- Amanita parvirufobrunnescens
- Amanita parvivirginea
- Amanita pausiaca
- Amanita peckiana
- Amanita pelioma
- Amanita pellucidula
- Amanita perpasta
- Amanita perphaea
- Amanita petalinovolva
- Amanita phaea
- Amanita picea
- Amanita pilosella
- Amanita pini
- Amanita pleropus
- Amanita polcovius
- Amanita populiphila
- Amanita praeclara
- Amanita praegraveolens
- Amanita praelongipes
- Amanita praelongispora
- Amanita preissii
- Amanita privigna
- Amanita pruittii
- Amanita psammolimbata
- Amanita pseudogemmata
- Amanita pseudomanginiana
- Amanita pseudopantherina
- Amanita pseudoprinceps
- Amanita pseudorufobrunnescens
- Amanita pseudospreta
- Amanita pseudosychnopyramis
- Amanita pseudovaginata
- Amanita pseudovalens
- Amanita pseudoverna
- Amanita pudibunda
- Amanita pudica
- Amanita pulchella
- Amanita pulverotecta
- Amanita pulverulenta
- Amanita pumatona
- Amanita pumila
- Amanita pupatju
- Amanita pyramidata
- Amanita pyramidiferina
- Amanita pyriformis
- Amanita queletii
- Amanita quenda
- Amanita radiata
- Amanita rajendrae
- Amanita recutitiformis
- Amanita reidiana
- Amanita reidii
- Amanita retenta
- Amanita rhoadsii
- Amanita rhodophylla
- Amanita ristichii
- Amanita robusta
- Amanita romagnesiana
- Amanita rosea
- Amanita roseolamellata
- Amanita roseolescens
- Amanita roseolifolia
- Amanita roseophylla
- Amanita rubiginosa
- Amanita rubroflava
- Amanita rubromarginata
- Amanita rufoferruginea
- Amanita russuloides
- Amanita sabulicola
- Amanita salmonea
- Amanita salmonescens
- Amanita sampajensis
- Amanita savannae
- Amanita schaefferi
- Amanita sepiacea
- Amanita sepultipes
- Amanita shennongjiana
- Amanita shorea
- Amanita siamensis
- Amanita sichotensis
- Amanita silvatica
- Amanita silvicola
- Amanita silvifuga
- Amanita simlensis
- Amanita simsimulans
- Amanita sinensis
- Amanita sinocitrina
- Amanita sinofulva
- Amanita solitariiformis
- Amanita sordidobubalina
- Amanita sordidogrisea
- Amanita sordidoides
- Amanita sororcula
- Amanita spissacea
- Amanita spretella
- Amanita squamosa
- Amanita squarrosa
- Amanita squarrosipes
- Amanita sternbergii
- Amanita stranella
- Amanita striatuloides
- Amanita strobilaceoides
- Amanita strobilaceovolvata
- Amanita strobilipes
- Amanita strophiolata
- Amanita subalbida
- Amanita subcaligata
- Amanita subcitriniceps
- Amanita suberis
- Amanita subfraudulenta
- Amanita subfrostiana
- Amanita subfuliginea
- Amanita subfuliginosa
- Amanita subglobosa
- Amanita subhemibapha
- Amanita sublutea
- Amanita sublutescens
- Amanita submaculata
- Amanita submelleialba
- Amanita submutabilis
- Amanita suborientifulva
- Amanita subovalispora
- Amanita subparvipantherina
- Amanita subphalloides
- Amanita subrecutita
- Amanita subremota
- Amanita subsolitaria
- Amanita subspissa
- Amanita subtropicana
- Amanita subvaginata
- Amanita subvirginiana
- Amanita subviscosa
- Amanita subvolvata
- Amanita sulcatissima
- Amanita sulphurea
- Amanita sumatrensis
- Amanita supravolvata
- Amanita sychnopyramis
- Amanita taiepa
- Amanita tarda
- Amanita tecomate
- Amanita tenacipulvis
- Amanita tenuifolia
- Amanita tenuifulva
- Amanita tephropluteus
- Amanita theioleuca
- Amanita timida
- Amanita tjibodensis
- Amanita tomentosivolva
- Amanita torrendii
- Amanita tristis
- Amanita tullossiana
- Amanita tullossii
- Amanita tuza
- Amanita uapacae
- Amanita umbrinelloides
- Amanita umbrinidisca
- Amanita ushuaiensis
- Amanita variabilis
- Amanita variicolor
- Amanita vernella
- Amanita vernicoccora
- Amanita verniformis
- Amanita verrucosivolva
- Amanita vestita
- Amanita violettae
- Amanita virella
- Amanita virginea
- Amanita virginiana
- Amanita viridissima
- Amanita viscidolutea
- Amanita vladimirii
- Amanita wadjukiorum
- Amanita wadulawitu
- Amanita walpolei
- Amanita watlingii
- Amanita watsoniana
- Amanita xanthella
- Amanita xanthogala
- Amanita xanthomargaros
- Amanita xenokommosis
- Amanita xerocybe
- Amanita yenii
- Amanita yuaniana
- Amanita yucatanensis
