= Amanita cinereovelata =

Scientific classification
- Domain: Eukaryota
- Kingdom: Fungi
- Division: Basidiomycota
- Class: Agaricomycetes
- Order: Agaricales
- Family: Amanitaceae
- Genus: Amanita
- Species: A. cinereovelata

Binomial name
- Amanita cinereovelata Iqbal Hosen (2015)

Species of fungus

Amanita cinereovelata is a species of the fungal family Amanitaceae. It was the first generic report for Bangladesh, described as a new species to science in 2015. This species belongs to the subgenus Lepidella section Lepidella. It is only known from Bangladesh, and putatively ectomycorrhizal association with Shorea robusta.

== See also ==
- List of Amanita species
