= Amanita parviexitialis =

Scientific classification
- Domain: Eukaryota
- Kingdom: Fungi
- Division: Basidiomycota
- Class: Agaricomycetes
- Order: Agaricales
- Family: Amanitaceae
- Genus: Amanita
- Species: A. parviexitialis

Binomial name
- Amanita parviexitialis Qing Cai, Zhu L. Yang & Y.Y. Cui

Species of fungus

Amanita parviexitialis is a mushroom of the large genus Amanita, which occurs under beech in southern China (Guangdong Province).

== See also ==
- List of Amanita species
- List of deadly fungi
