= Amanita aliena =

Scientific classification
- Kingdom: Fungi
- Division: Basidiomycota
- Class: Agaricomycetes
- Order: Agaricales
- Family: Amanitaceae
- Genus: Amanita
- Species: A. aliena

Binomial name
- Amanita aliena Wartchow & Cortez (2016)

Species of fungus

Amanita aliena
- Mycological characteristics
- Gills on hymenium
- Cap is convex
- Hymenium is adnate
- Stipe has a ring
- Ecology is mycorrhizal
- Edibility is unknown

Amanita aliena is a fungus belonging to the genus Amanita and the subgenus of the same name. Its name comes from the Latin word "aliena," which stands for "foreign". It grows in isolation on soil and is in association with Eucalyptus trees. Its distribution is said to span south Brazil from the States of Rio Grande do Sul to Santa Catarina. The first specimen was discovered in 2008, but it was not published until 2016.

== See also ==
- List of Amanita species
