= Amanita subfuliginea =

Scientific classification
- Domain: Eukaryota
- Kingdom: Fungi
- Division: Basidiomycota
- Class: Agaricomycetes
- Order: Agaricales
- Family: Amanitaceae
- Genus: Amanita
- Species: A. subfuliginea

Binomial name
- Amanita subfuliginea Qing Cai, Zhu L. Yang & Y.Y. Cui

Species of fungus

Amanita subfuliginea is a mushroom of the large genus Amanita, which occurs central and southern China (Hunan and Guangdong Provinces). It is closely related to the east Asian death cap A. fuliginea.

== See also ==
- List of Amanita species
- List of deadly fungi
