= Amanita volvarielloides =

Scientific classification
- Domain: Eukaryota
- Kingdom: Fungi
- Division: Basidiomycota
- Class: Agaricomycetes
- Order: Agaricales
- Family: Amanitaceae
- Genus: Amanita
- Species: A. volvarielloides

Binomial name
- Amanita volvarielloides B.J.Rees

Species of fungus

Amanita volvarielloides is a deadly mushroom classified by B. J. Rees.

The mushroom exists in Australia.

== See also ==
- List of Amanita species
