= Amanita pseudoinculta =

Scientific classification
- Kingdom: Fungi
- Division: Basidiomycota
- Class: Agaricomycetes
- Order: Agaricales
- Family: Amanitaceae
- Genus: Amanita
- Species: A. pseudoinculta

Binomial name
- Amanita pseudoinculta Justo

Species of fungus

Amanita pseudoinculta is a mushroom from the Amanita genus.

== Description ==
Amanita pseudoinculta is a sectoid or an underground mushroom. It has a white spore print, light colored gills, and a volva like, all the other Amanita mushrooms.

== Range ==
Amanita pseudoinculta is found in Western Australia.

== Etymology ==
Pseudo means "false" and inculta means "uncultivated", so pseudoinculta means "uncultivated" or "false inculta".
