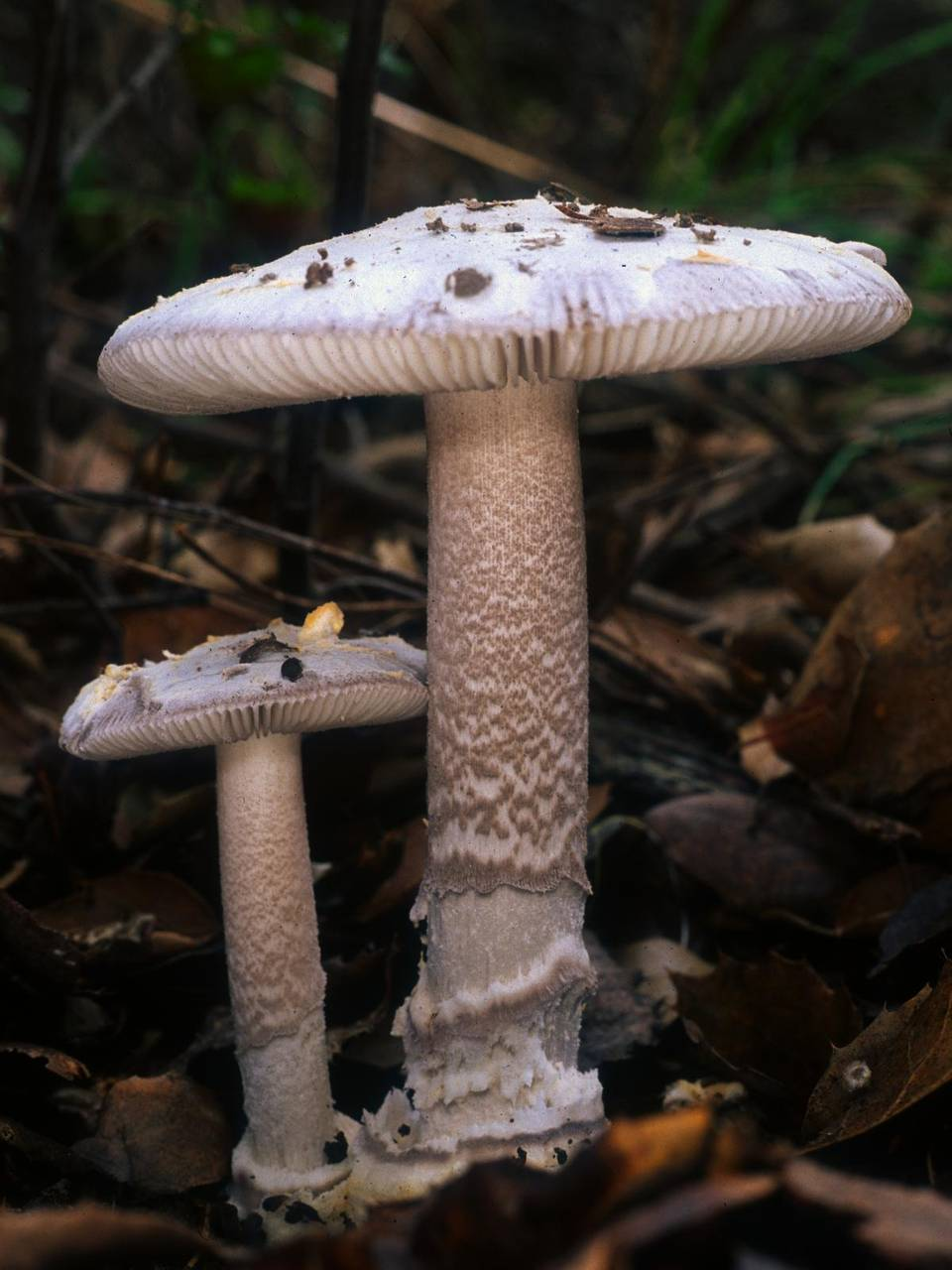

Scientific classification
- Domain: Eukaryota
- Kingdom: Fungi
- Division: Basidiomycota
- Class: Agaricomycetes
- Order: Agaricales
- Family: Amanitaceae
- Genus: Amanita
- Species: A. protecta

Binomial name
- Amanita protecta Tulloss & Wright 1989

= Amanita protecta =

Species of fungus

Amanita protecta is a species of Amanita found in California growing solitary among Quercus agrifolia and Monterey pine.
