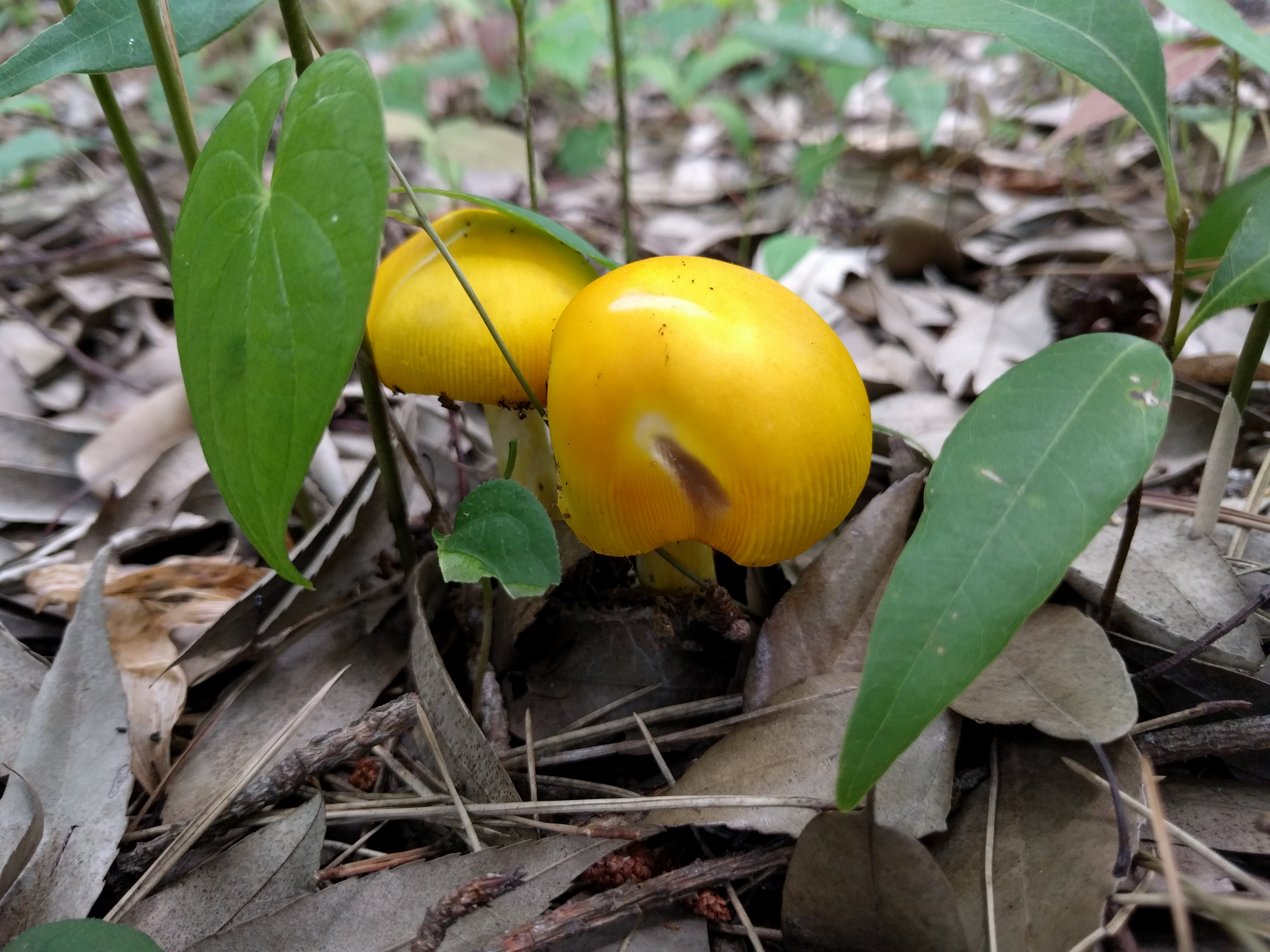

Scientific classification
- Kingdom: Fungi
- Division: Basidiomycota
- Class: Agaricomycetes
- Order: Agaricales
- Family: Amanitaceae
- Genus: Amanita
- Species: A. kitamagotake

Binomial name
- Amanita kitamagotake N. Endo & A. Yamada, 2017

= Amanita kitamagotake =

Species of fungus

Amanita kitamagotake is a fungal species of Amanitaceae found in Asia.

It is known in Japanese as kitamagotake (キタマゴタケ).

== Ecology and habitat ==
It is found in Japan and China.

Squamanita mira is a parasite of this species.

== Edibility ==
This mushroom is edible.
