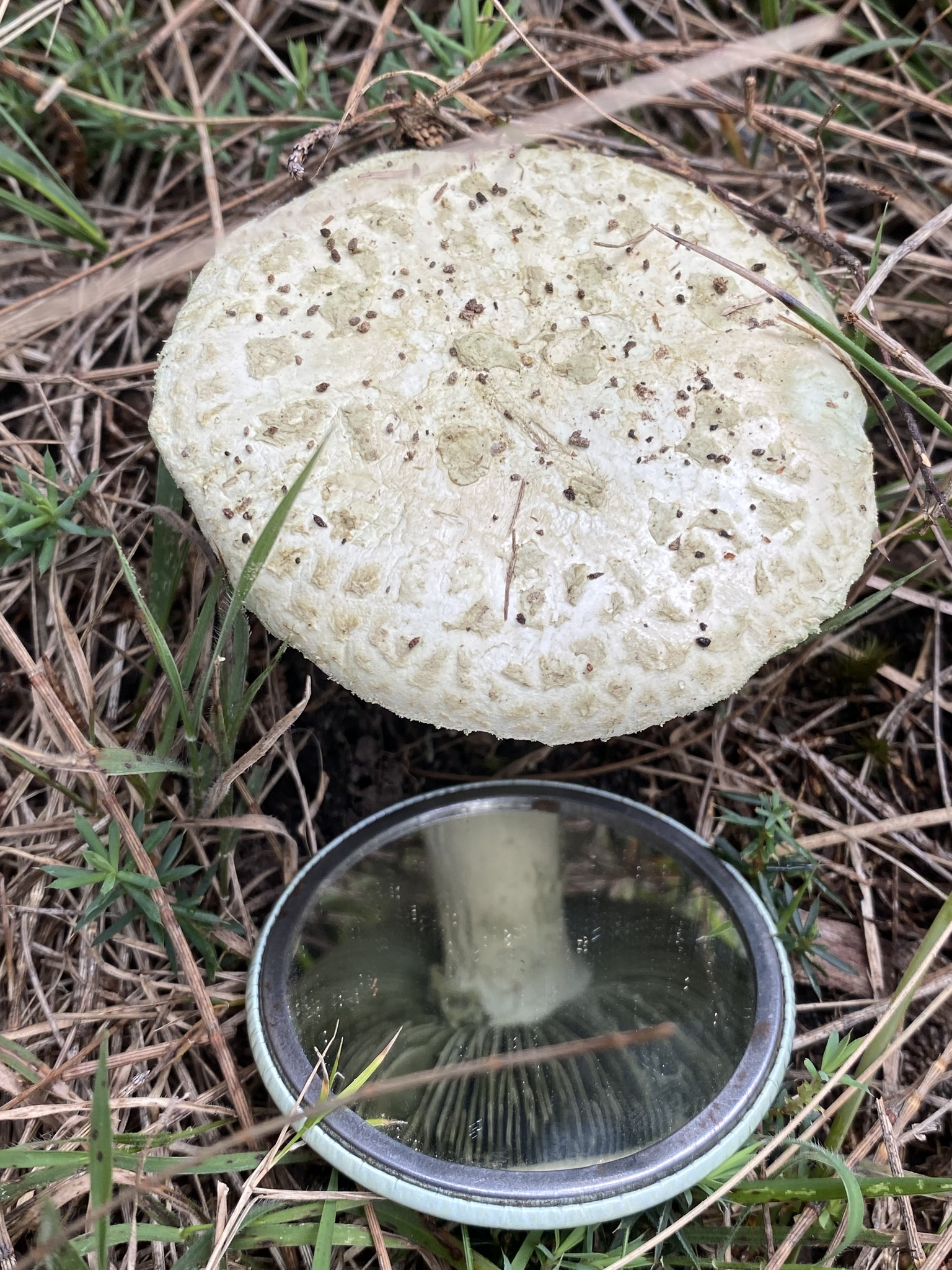

Scientific classification
- Domain: Eukaryota
- Kingdom: Fungi
- Division: Basidiomycota
- Class: Agaricomycetes
- Order: Agaricales
- Family: Amanitaceae
- Genus: Amanita
- Species: A. austroviridis

Binomial name
- Amanita austroviridis O.K.Mill.

= Amanita austroviridis =

Species of fungus

Amanita austroviridis, commonly known as the Australian verdigris lepidella, is a species of agaric fungus in the family Amanitaceae native to Australia.
