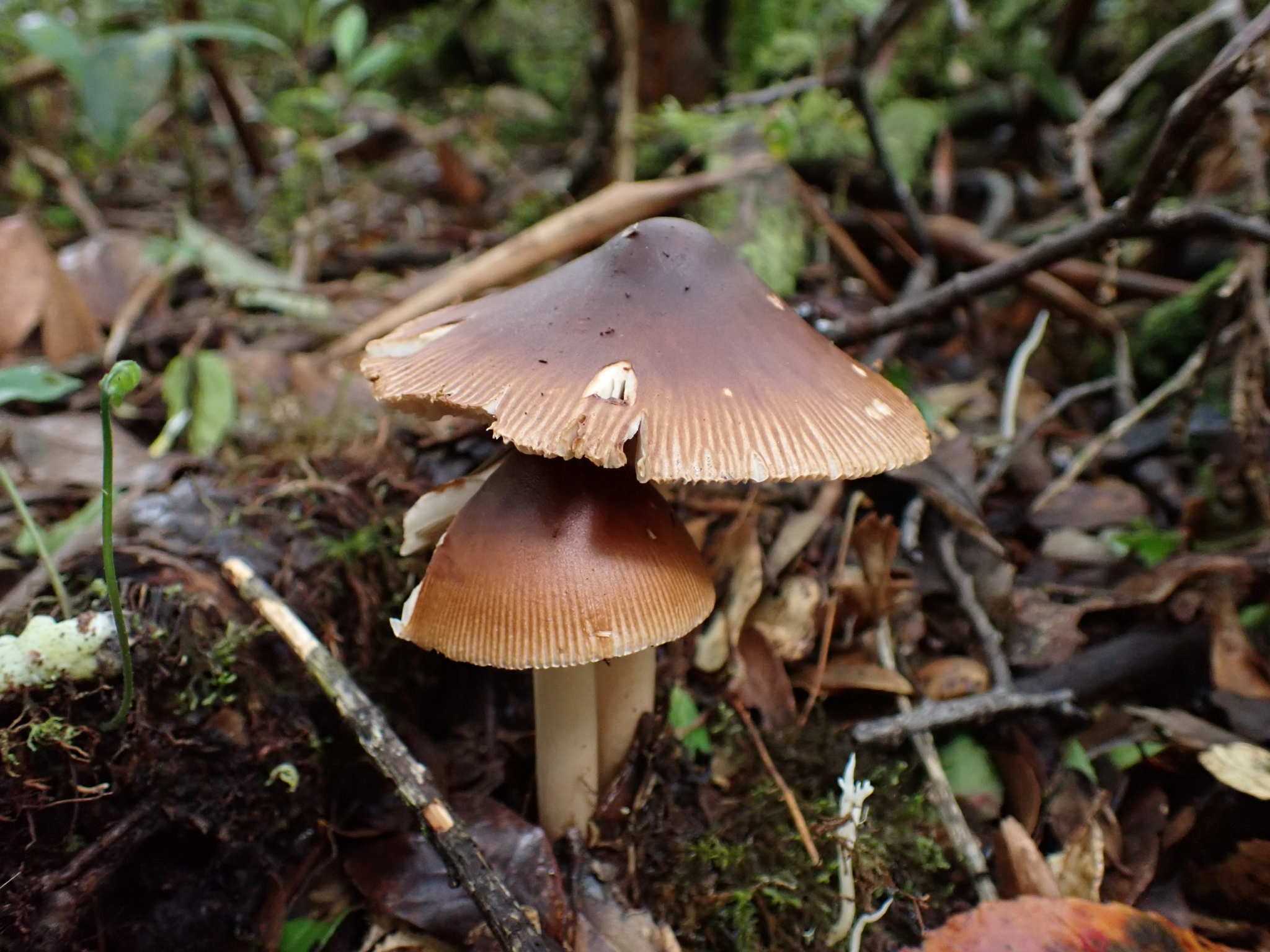

Conservation status
- Vulnerable (IUCN 3.1)

Scientific classification
- Kingdom: Fungi
- Division: Basidiomycota
- Class: Agaricomycetes
- Order: Agaricales
- Family: Amanitaceae
- Genus: Amanita
- Species: A. fuligineodisca

Binomial name
- Amanita fuligineodisca Tulloss, Ovrebo & Halling

= Amanita fuligineodisca =

Species of fungus

Amanita fuligineodisca is a species of Amanita found in Honduras to Andean Colombia.
