= Amanita malayensis =

Scientific classification
- Kingdom: Fungi
- Division: Basidiomycota
- Class: Agaricomycetes
- Order: Agaricales
- Family: Amanitaceae
- Genus: Amanita
- Species: A. malayensis

Binomial name
- Amanita malayensis L.P. Tang, Zhu L. Yang & S.S. Lee

Amanita malayensis Mycological characteristics
- Gills on hymenium
- Cap is convex or flat
- Hymenium is free
- Stipe has a ring and volva
- Spore print is white
- Ecology is mycorrhizal
- Edibility is unknown or edible

Amanita malayensis is a mushroom in the family Amanitaceae. It is a rare mushroom, found mostly in Malaysia, Singapore, & Thailand, but is possibly found all over Indochina. It might be a Caesarea Amanita, bearing many similarities to that of Amanita hemibapha, Amanita javanica and Amanita rubromarginata. While not consumed in Malaysia, it is eaten in rural Thailand. Due to its rarity and lack of research, not known is much about this mushroom, as this mushroom was only first discovered in the late 2000s. This Amanita usually grows in fairy rings.
