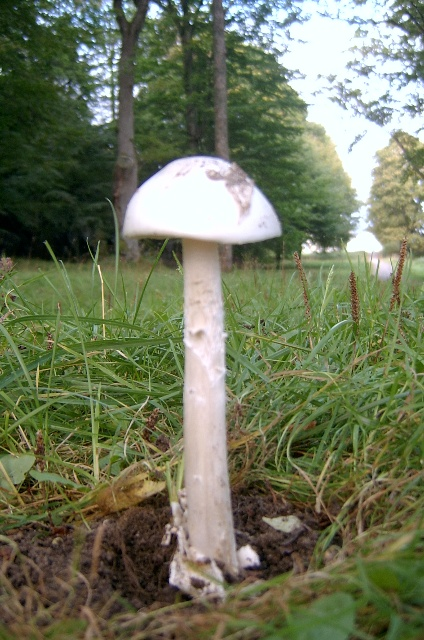

Scientific classification
- Kingdom: Fungi
- Division: Basidiomycota
- Class: Agaricomycetes
- Order: Agaricales
- Family: Amanitaceae
- Genus: Amanita
- Species: A. arctica

Binomial name
- Amanita arctica Bas, Knudsen & T.Borgen, 1987

= Amanita arctica =

Species of fungus

Amanita arctica is a species of Amanita found in Greenland and Norway.
