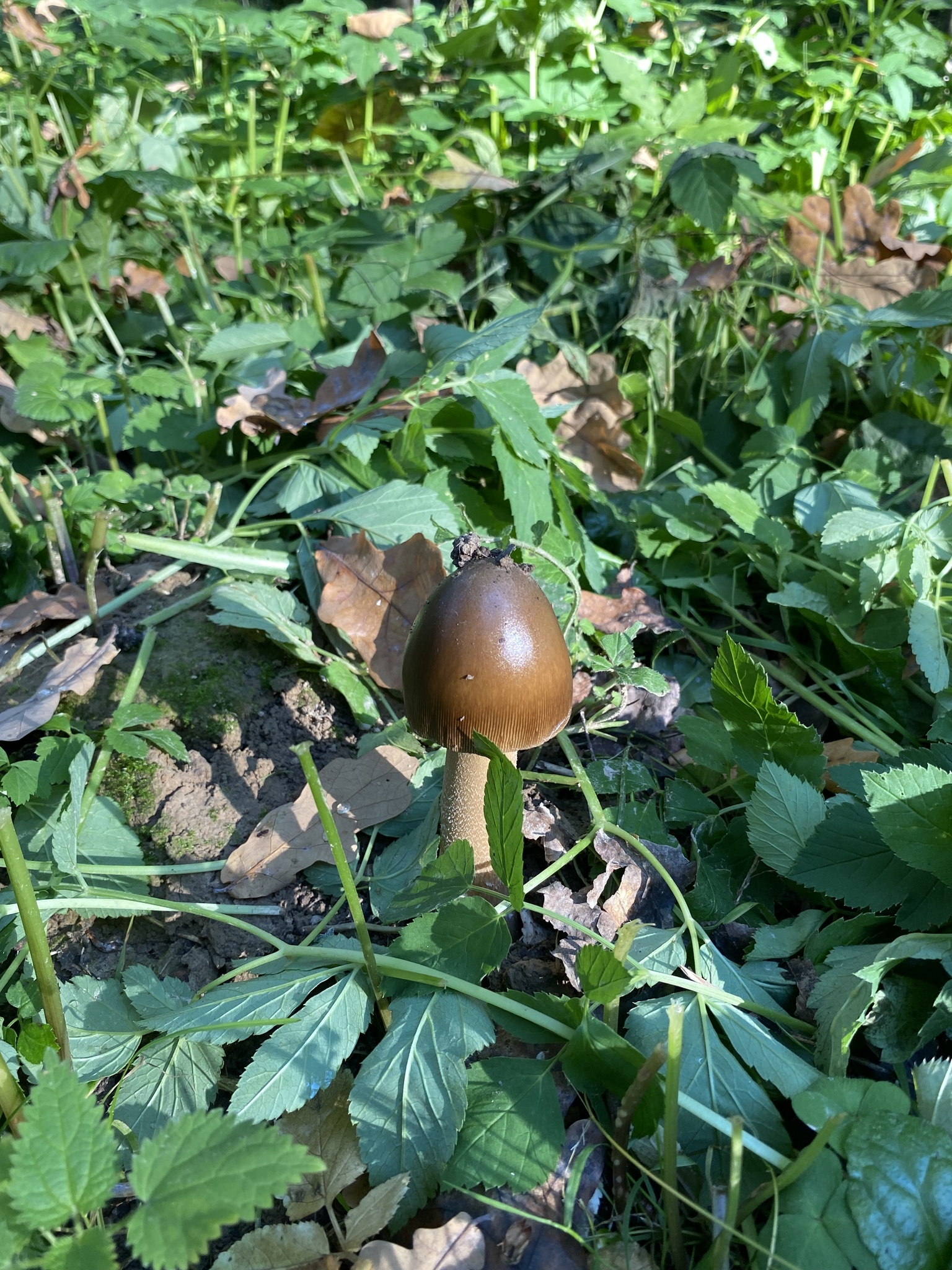

Scientific classification
- Kingdom: Fungi
- Division: Basidiomycota
- Class: Agaricomycetes
- Order: Agaricales
- Family: Amanitaceae
- Genus: Amanita
- Species: A. spadicea

Binomial name
- Amanita spadicea Pers. (1797)

= Amanita spadicea =

Species of mushroom

Amanita spadicea is a mushroom in the Amanita genus that can be found in Europe.
