= Amanita oleosa =

Scientific classification
- Kingdom: Fungi
- Division: Basidiomycota
- Class: Agaricomycetes
- Order: Agaricales
- Family: Amanitaceae
- Genus: Amanita
- Species: A. oleosa

Binomial name
- Amanita oleosa (Bougher & T. Lebel) Justo

Species of fungus

Amanita oleosa
- Mycological characteristics
- Glebal hymenium
- No distinct cap
- Hymenium attachment is not applicable
- Lacks a stipe
- Spore print is white
- Ecology is mycorrhizal
- Edibility is unknown

Amanita oleosa is a species of mushroom in the genus Amanita. This species has a truffle-like, underground fruiting body and was originally described in the genus Amarrendia.
