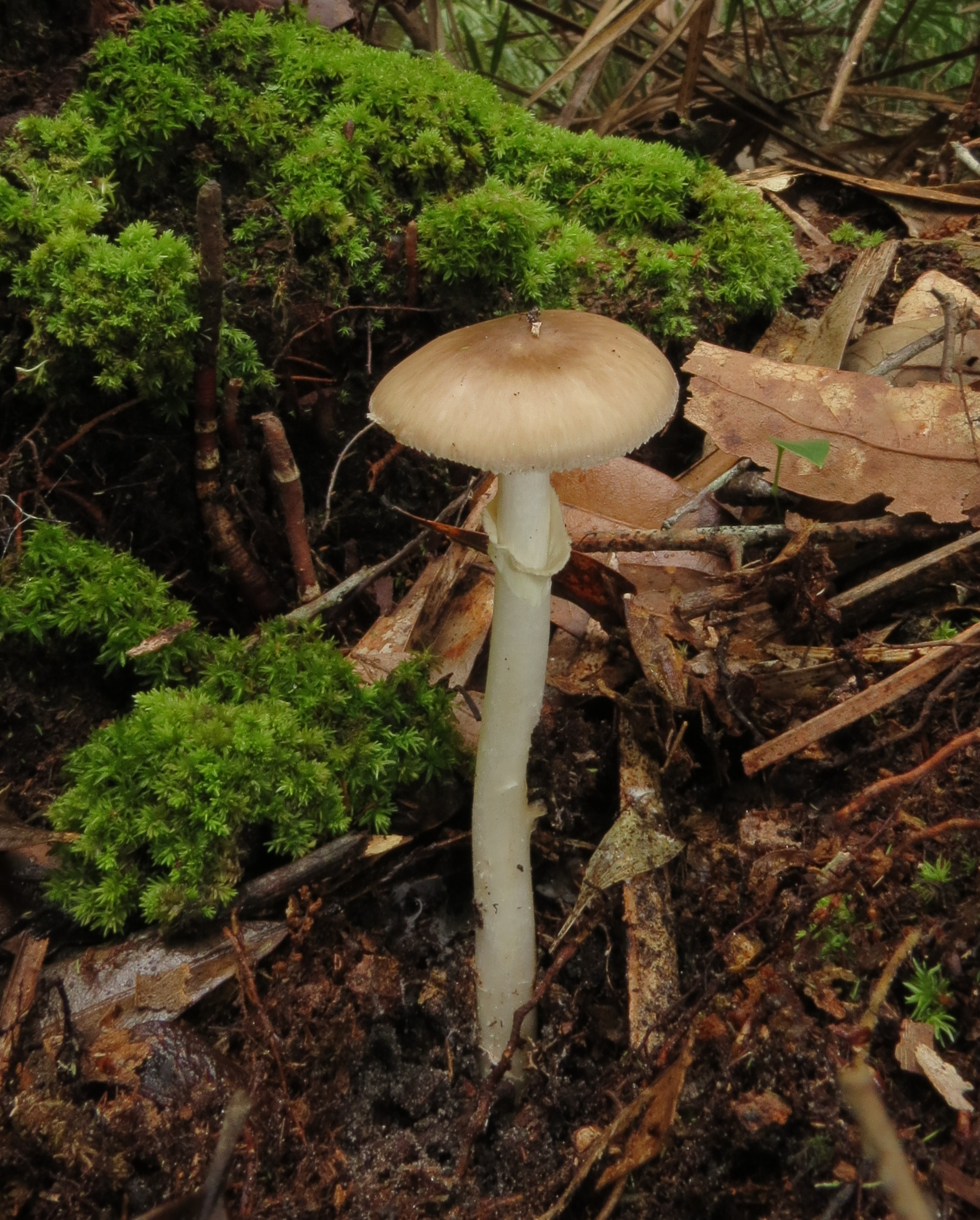

Scientific classification
- Kingdom: Fungi
- Division: Basidiomycota
- Class: Agaricomycetes
- Order: Agaricales
- Family: Amanitaceae
- Genus: Amanita
- Species: A. solaniolens

Binomial name
- Amanita solaniolens H.L. Stewart & Grund 1974

= Amanita solaniolens =

Species of fungus

Amanita solaniolens
- Mycological characteristics
- Gills on hymenium
- Cap is convex or flat
- Hymenium is free
- Stipe has a ring and volva
- Spore print is white
- Ecology is mycorrhizal
- Edibility is unknown

Amanita solaniolens or old potato amanita is a species of Amanita from Nova Scotia, Canada.
