= Amanita grandis =

Scientific classification
- Kingdom: Fungi
- Division: Basidiomycota
- Class: Agaricomycetes
- Order: Agaricales
- Family: Amanitaceae
- Genus: Amanita
- Species: A. grandis

Binomial name
- Amanita grandis Justo, 2010

Synonyms
- Torrendia grandis Bougher

Species of fungus

Amanita grandis is a sequestrate (secotioid) (underground) mushroom from Western Australia.

== Description ==
Amanita grandis has a white spore, light-colored gills, and a volva, but as a secotoid, it looks different than other above-ground mushrooms.

== Range ==
Amanita grandis is found in Western Australia.

== Etymology ==
Grandis means "great" or "large," so Amanita grandis means "great mushroom."
