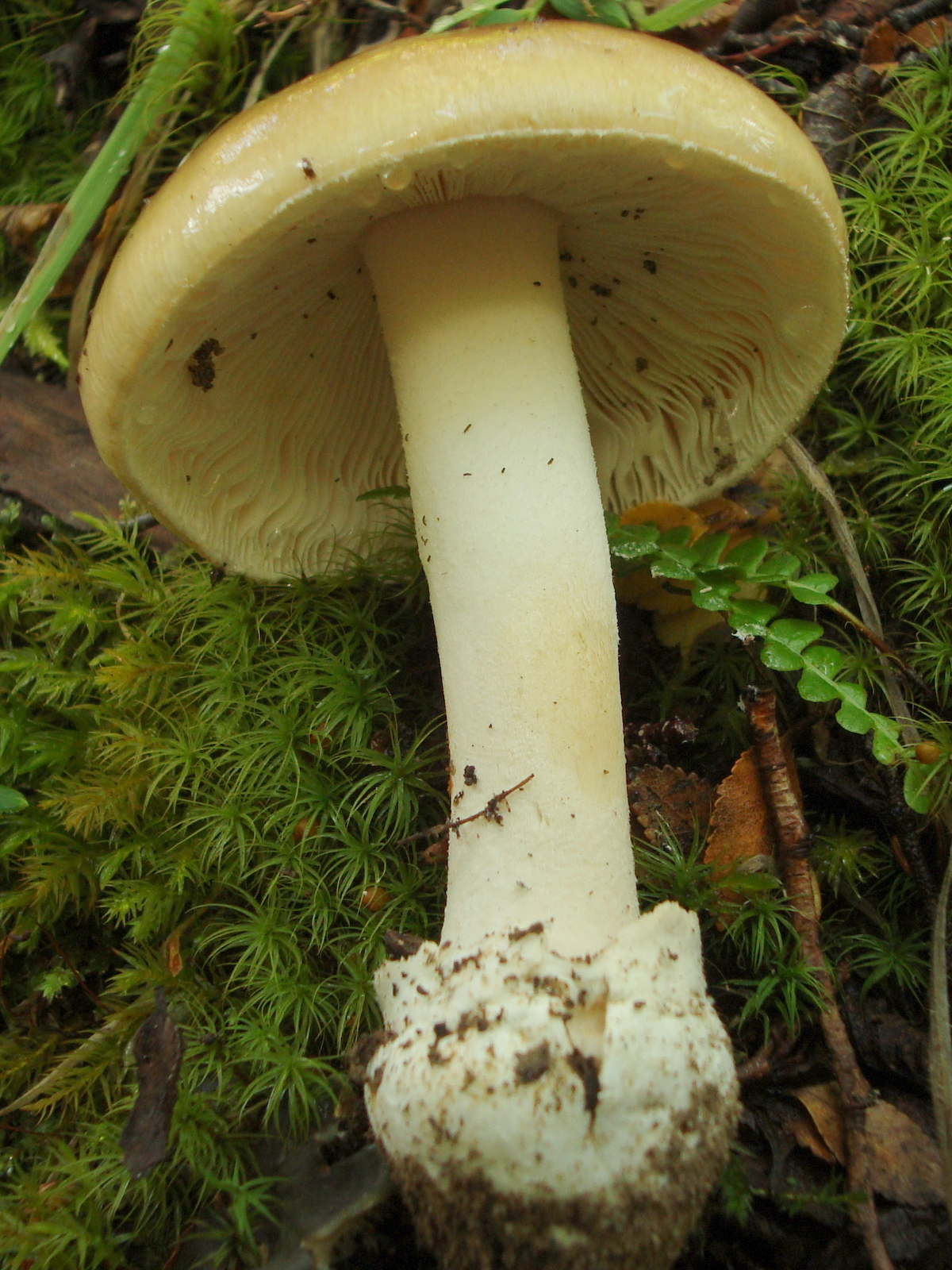

Scientific classification
- Kingdom: Fungi
- Division: Basidiomycota
- Class: Agaricomycetes
- Order: Agaricales
- Family: Amanitaceae
- Genus: Amanita
- Species: A. diemii

Binomial name
- Amanita diemii Singer 1954

= Amanita diemii =

Species of fungus

Amanita diemii is a species of Amanita found growing under Nothofagus in Argentina and Chile.

== Description ==
=== Cap ===
Amanita diemii has a cap that is about 33 - 78 mm wide. It is first bright yellow, then it slowly becomes darker. It starts off convex, but later it becomes depressed. It lacks an umbo and is always viscid. It has yellow flesh and doesn't change color when cut or bruised.

=== Gills ===
Amanita diemii has white gills that are free and crowded.

=== Stem ===
The stem of Amanita diemii is 45 - 98 × 8 - 18 mm. It is first white then, it is cinnamon. The volva is 14 - 21 × 10 - 17 mm and is white. It has white flesh.

=== Spores ===
The spores of Amanita diemii measure (9.0-) 9.5- 11.5 (-12.8) × (7.5-) 8.2 - 10.2 (-11.5) μm.

=== Taste ===
Amanita diemii has no smell and has a mild taste.

== Habitat ==
Amanita diemii is found under Nothofagus in Argentina and Chile.
