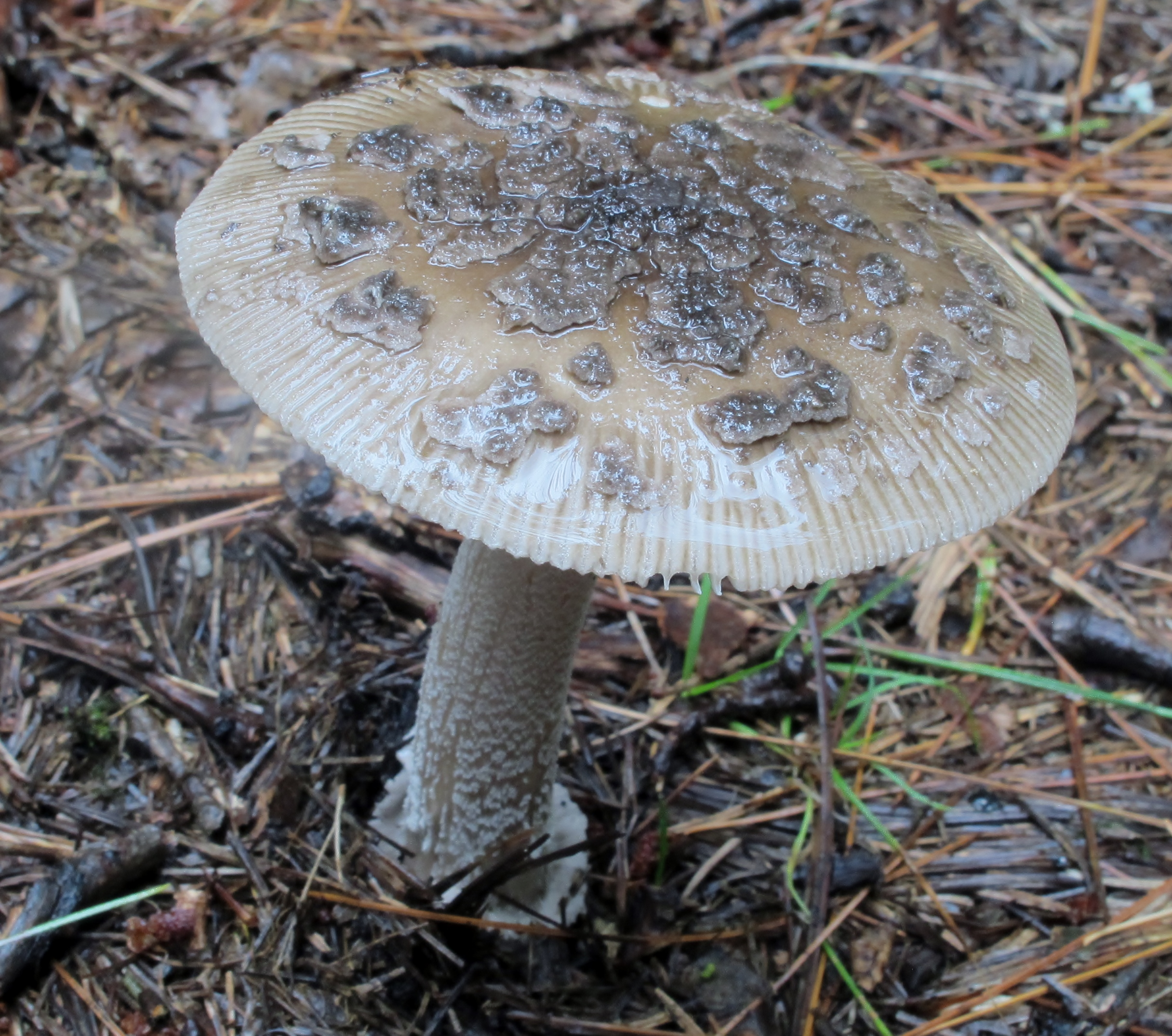

Scientific classification
- Domain: Eukaryota
- Kingdom: Fungi
- Division: Basidiomycota
- Class: Agaricomycetes
- Order: Agaricales
- Family: Amanitaceae
- Genus: Amanita
- Species: A. rhacopus

Binomial name
- Amanita rhacopus Y. Lamoureux, 2018

= Amanita rhacopus =

Species of fungus

Amanita rhacopus is a species of Amanita found in east coast of the United States
