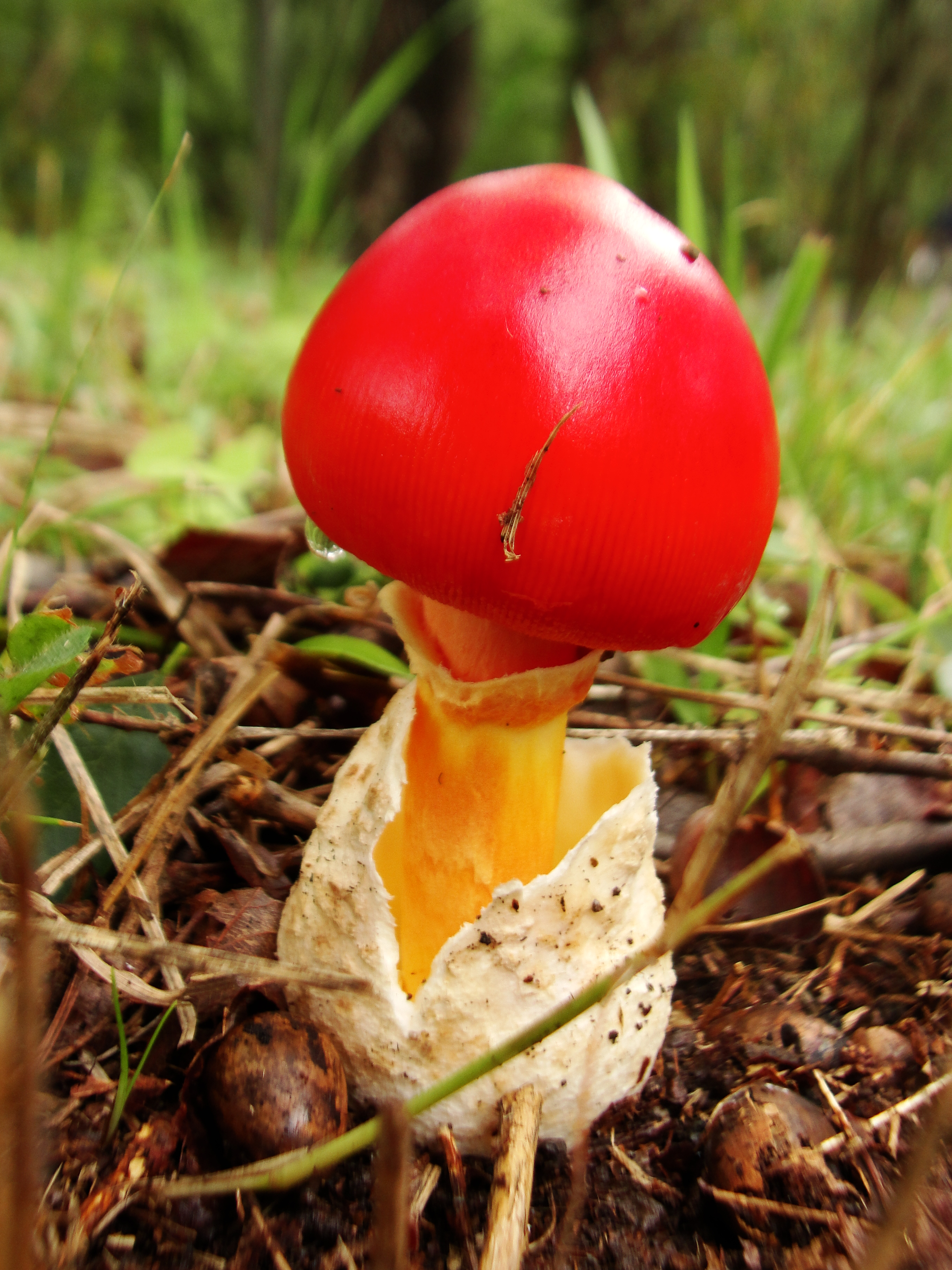

Scientific classification
- Kingdom: Fungi
- Division: Basidiomycota
- Class: Agaricomycetes
- Order: Agaricales
- Family: Amanitaceae
- Genus: Amanita
- Species: A. caesareoides

Binomial name
- Amanita caesareoides Lyu. N. Vassilieva 1950

= Amanita caesareoides =

Species of fungus

Amanita caesareoides is a species of Amanita from China, Korea, and Japan.
