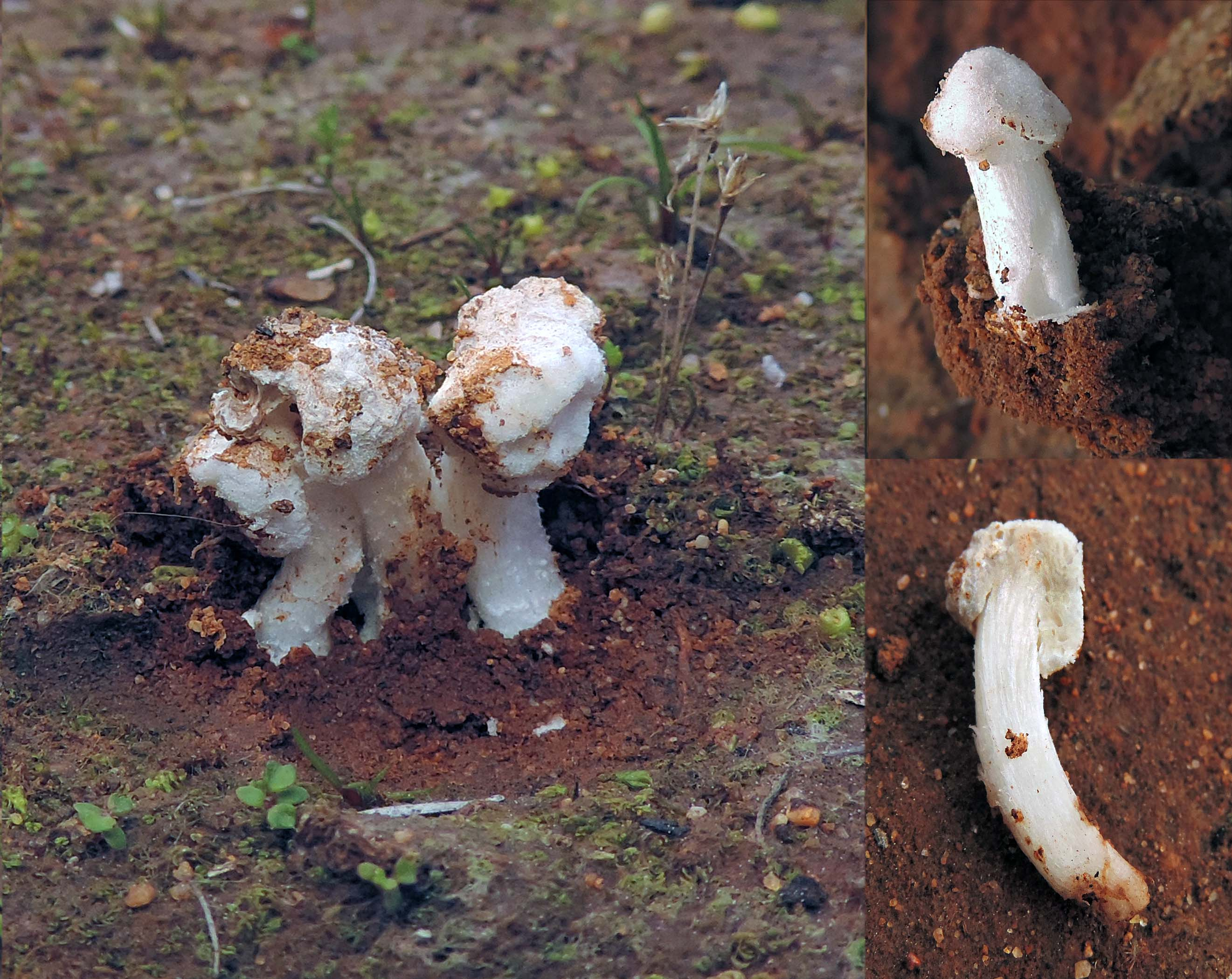

Scientific classification
- Kingdom: Fungi
- Division: Basidiomycota
- Class: Agaricomycetes
- Order: Agaricales
- Family: Amanitaceae
- Genus: Amanita
- Species: A. arenaria

Binomial name
- Amanita arenaria O.K. Mill., E. Horak & Justo

= Amanita arenaria =

Species of fungi

Amanita arenaria is an Amanita mushroom found in the southern parts of Australia.Amanita arenaria has inamyloid spores compared to other mushrooms in the section.
