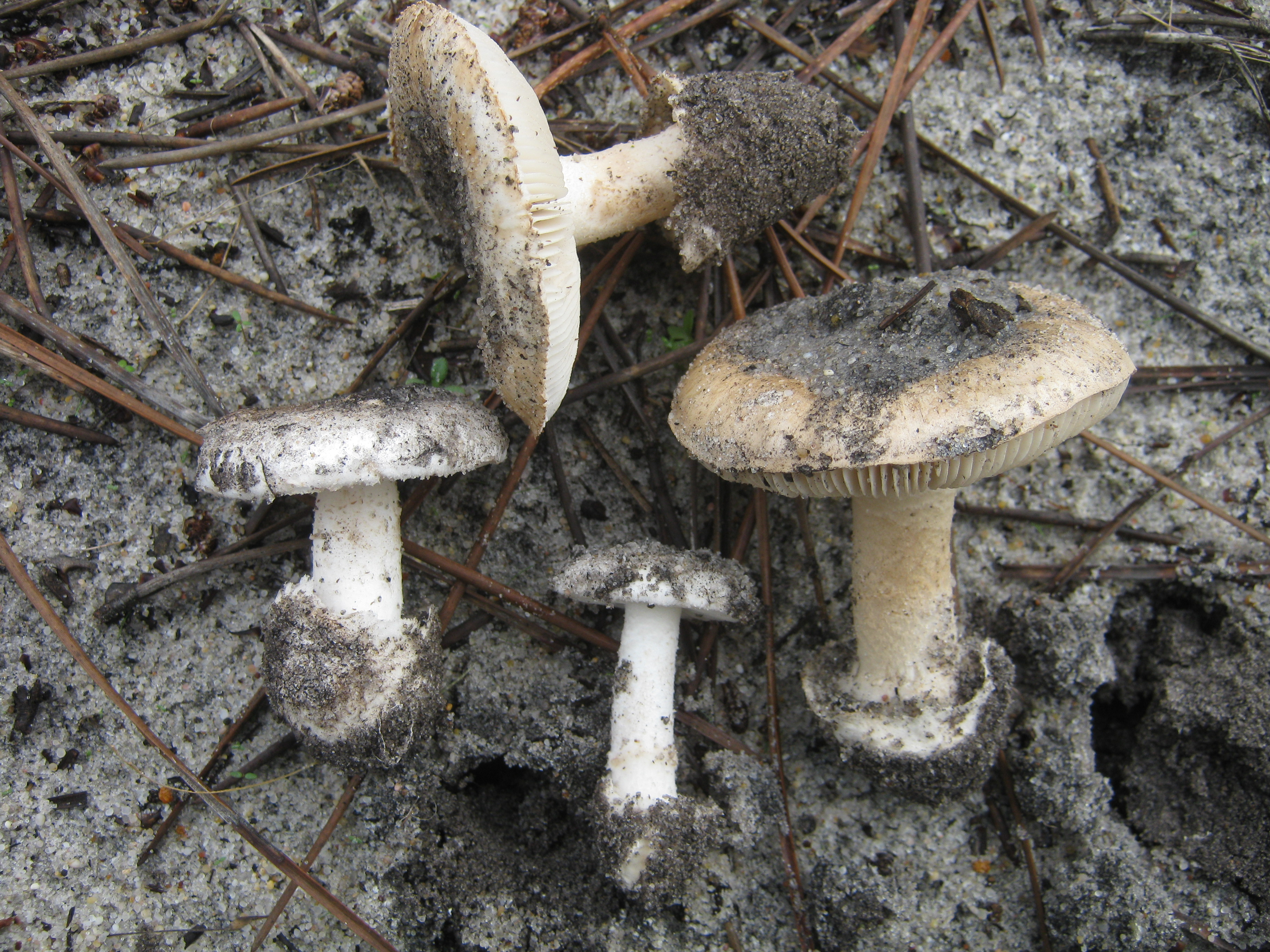

Scientific classification
- Kingdom: Fungi
- Division: Basidiomycota
- Class: Agaricomycetes
- Order: Agaricales
- Family: Amanitaceae
- Genus: Amanita
- Species: A. curtipes

Binomial name
- Amanita curtipes E.-J. Gilbert

= Amanita curtipes =

Species of fungus

Amanita curtipes is a species of Amanita from southern Europe.
