= Amanita advena =

Scientific classification
- Kingdom: Fungi
- Division: Basidiomycota
- Class: Agaricomycetes
- Order: Agaricales
- Family: Amanitaceae
- Genus: Amanita
- Species: A. advena

Binomial name
- Amanita advena Tulloss, Ovrebo & Halling

Species of fungi in the genus Amanita

Amanita advena is a mushroom from the Amanita genus.

== Description ==
Amanita advena has a white to light buff cap, free white to cream gills, and a white volva covered with brown warts. Its spore print is white. This species is found in Guatemala, Colombia, and Costa Rica. The edibility of the mushroom is unknown, but it should not be eaten, as many Amanita species are deadly.
