= Amanita griseofarinosa =

Scientific classification
- Kingdom: Fungi
- Division: Basidiomycota
- Class: Agaricomycetes
- Order: Agaricales
- Family: Amanitaceae
- Genus: Amanita
- Species: A. griseofarinosa

Binomial name
- Amanita griseofarinosa Hongo 1961

Species of fungus

Amanita griseofarinosa is a species of Amanita found in Taiwan, China, Japan, Thailand, Korea and Nepal. This species is found in tropical deciduous forests.
