= Amanita lesueurii =

Scientific classification
- Domain: Eukaryota
- Kingdom: Fungi
- Division: Basidiomycota
- Class: Agaricomycetes
- Order: Agaricales
- Family: Amanitaceae
- Genus: Amanita
- Species: A. lesueurii

Binomial name
- Amanita lesueurii E.M.Davison (2013)

Species of fungus

Amanita lesueurii is a species of fungus in the family Amanitaceae found in Western Australia.
