= Amanita toxica =

Scientific classification
- Kingdom: Fungi
- Division: Basidiomycota
- Class: Agaricomycetes
- Order: Agaricales
- Family: Amanitaceae
- Genus: Amanita
- Species: A. toxica

Binomial name
- Amanita toxica (Lazo) Garrido & Bresinsky

Species of mushroom

Amanita toxica or Lazo's Deadly Amanita is a deadly poisonous species of mushroom endemic to Chile, where it is often found in Pinus radiata plantations.
