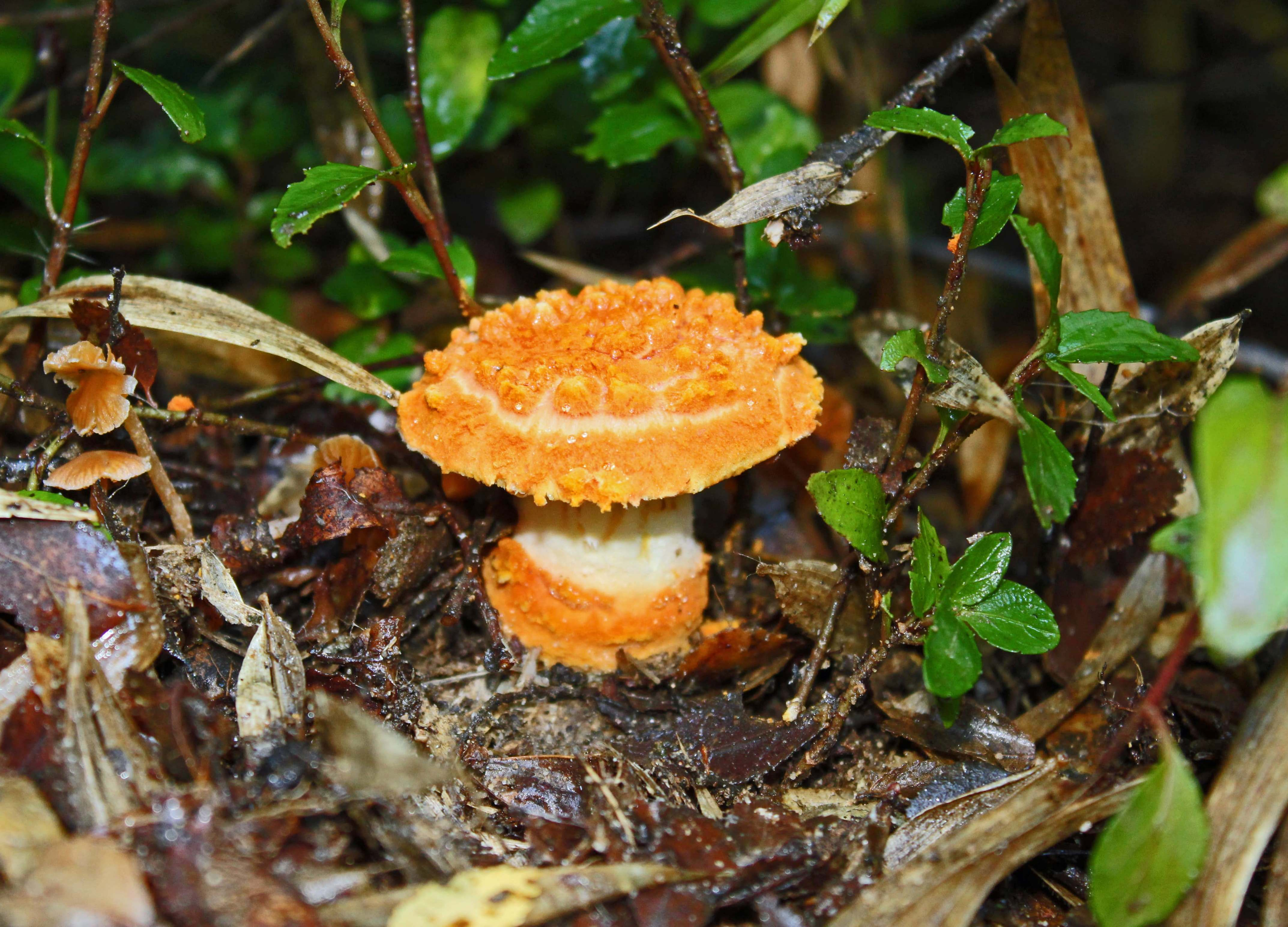

Scientific classification
- Kingdom: Fungi
- Division: Basidiomycota
- Class: Agaricomycetes
- Order: Agaricales
- Family: Amanitaceae
- Genus: Amanita
- Species: A. gayana

Binomial name
- Amanita gayana (Mont.) Sacc. 1887

= Amanita gayana =

Species of fungus

Amanita gayana or Gay's death cap is a species of Amanita from Chile.
