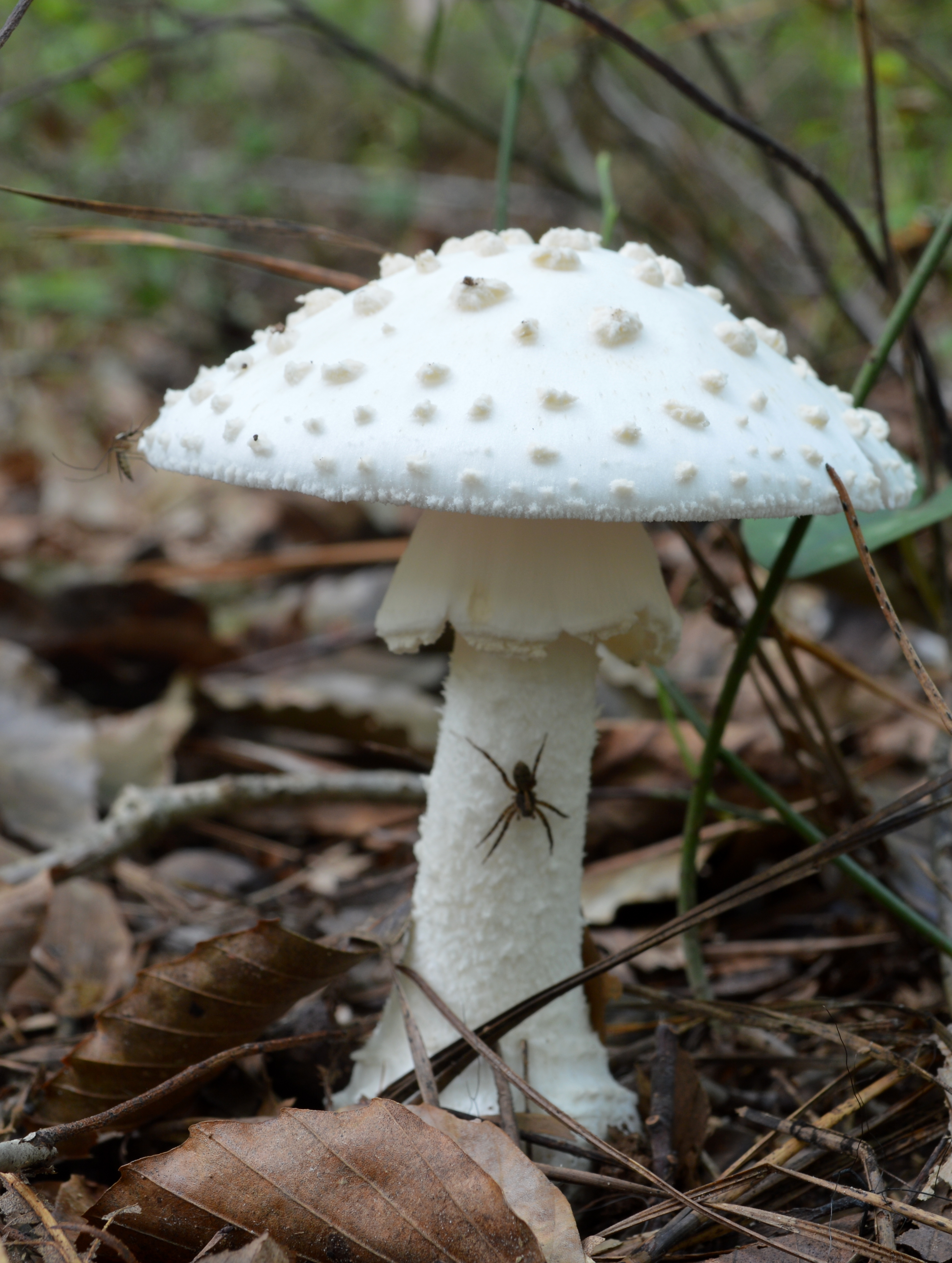

Scientific classification
- Kingdom: Fungi
- Division: Basidiomycota
- Class: Agaricomycetes
- Order: Agaricales
- Family: Amanitaceae
- Genus: Amanita
- Species: A. canescens

Binomial name
- Amanita canescens D.T. Jenkins 1982

= Amanita canescens =

Species of mushroom

Amanita canescens is a species of Amanita found from Connecticut to Alabama, United States.
