= Amanita aurantiovelata =

Scientific classification
- Kingdom: Fungi
- Division: Basidiomycota
- Class: Agaricomycetes
- Order: Agaricales
- Family: Amanitaceae
- Genus: Amanita
- Species: A. aurantiovelata

Binomial name
- Amanita aurantiovelata Schalkw. & G. M. Jansen

Species of fungus

Amanita aurantiovelata is a species of fungus in the family Amanitaceae within the order Agaricales, native to Chile.

== Taxonomy ==
The species was first described by botanists, Joost Schalkwijk and Gerrit M. Jansen, in 1982, based on specimens from Cuinco, Chile.
