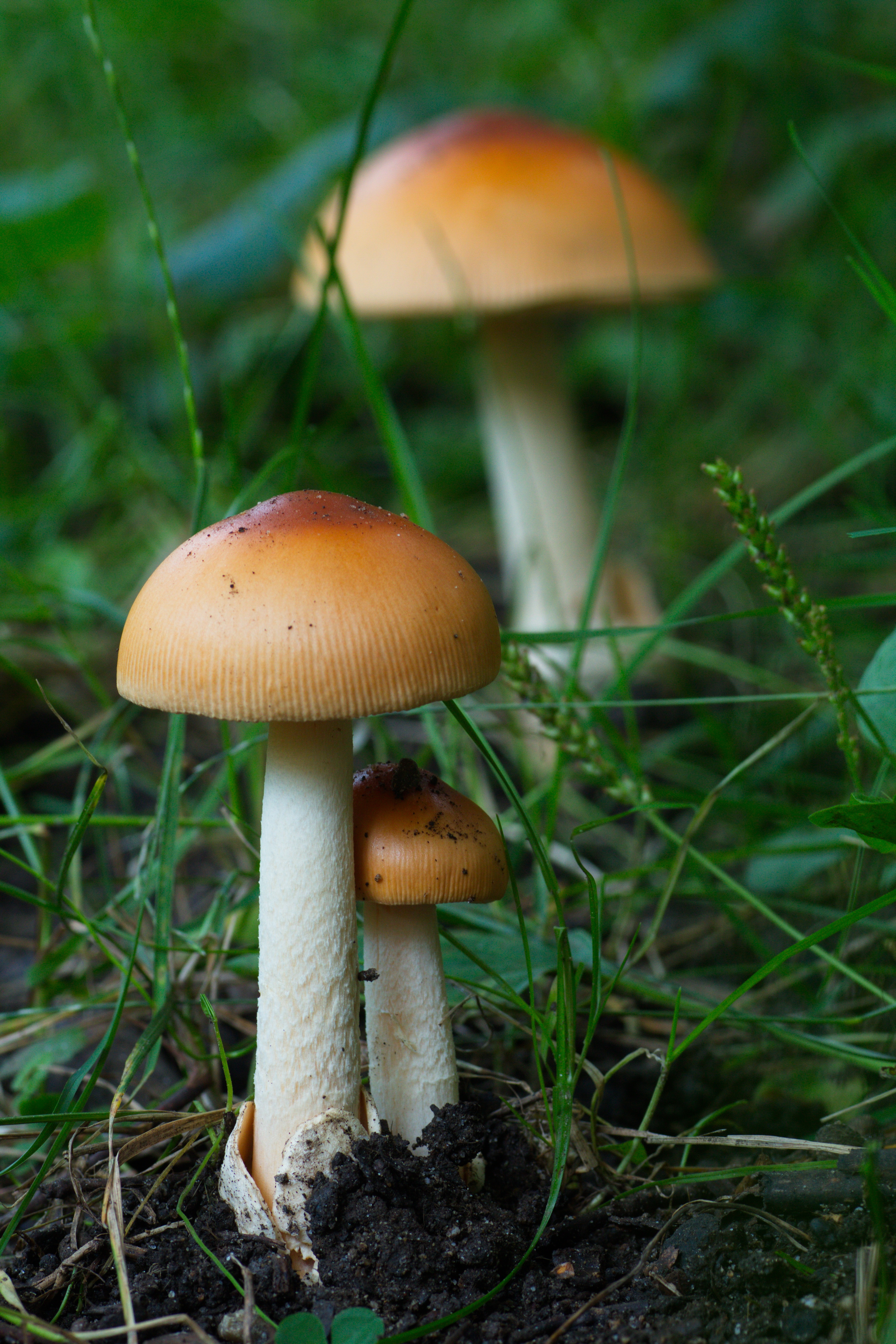

Scientific classification
- Kingdom: Fungi
- Division: Basidiomycota
- Class: Agaricomycetes
- Order: Agaricales
- Family: Amanitaceae
- Genus: Amanita
- Species: A. subnudipes

Binomial name
- Amanita subnudipes (Romagn.) Tulloss 2000

Synonyms
- Amanita crocea var. subnudipes Romagn. 1982

= Amanita subnudipes =

Species of mushroom

Amanita subnudipes is a species of Amanita found in Italy.
