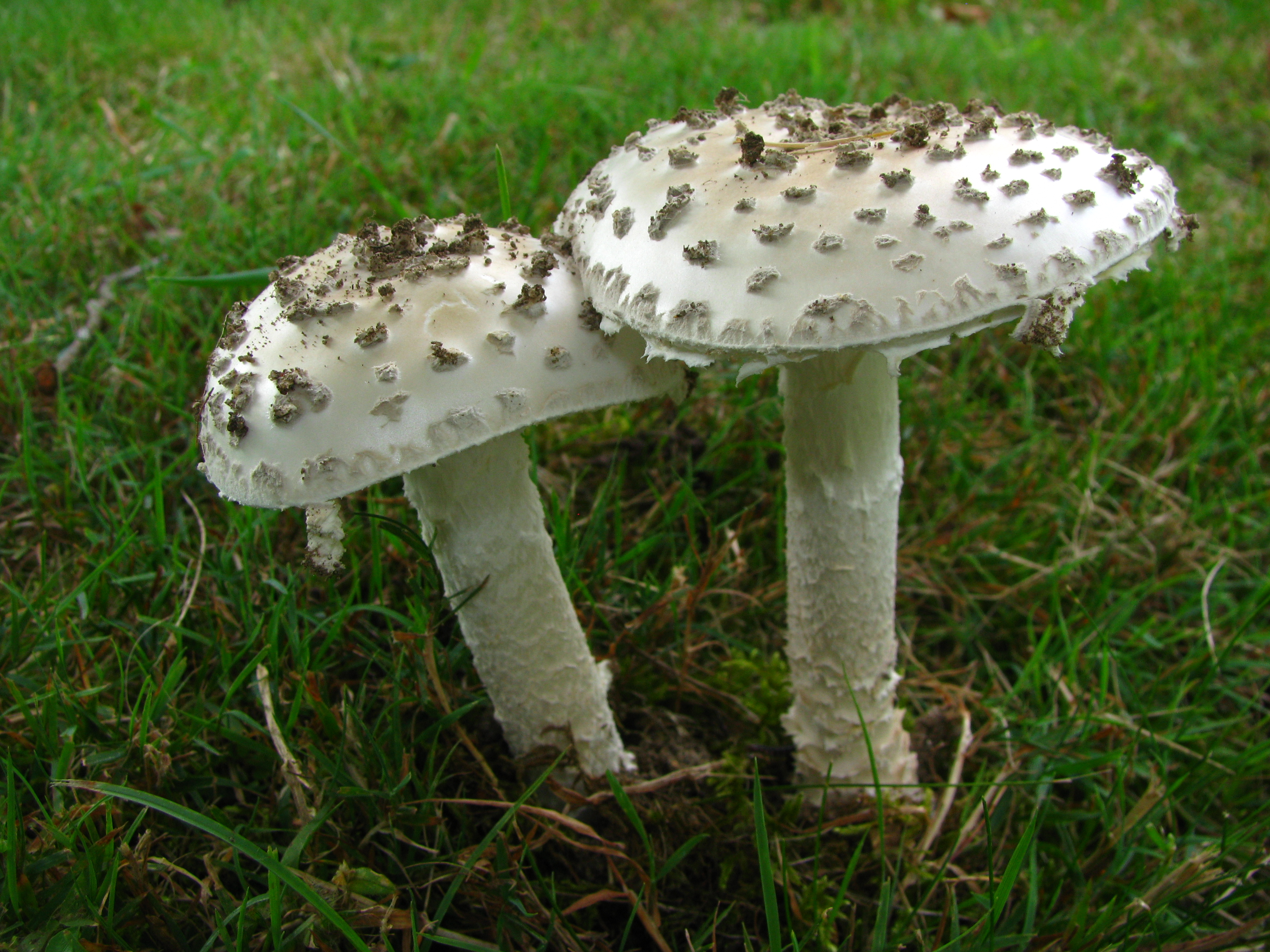

Scientific classification
- Kingdom: Fungi
- Division: Basidiomycota
- Class: Agaricomycetes
- Order: Agaricales
- Family: Amanitaceae
- Genus: Amanita
- Species: A. cinereopannosa

Binomial name
- Amanita cinereopannosa Bas (1969)

= Amanita cinereopannosa =

Species of fungus

Amanita cinereopannosa
- Mycological characteristics
- Gills on hymenium
- Cap is convex or flat
- Hymenium is free
- Spore print is white
- Ecology is mycorrhizal
- Edibility is unknown

Amanita cinereopannosa, commonly known as the gray rags lepidella, is a species of mushroom in the family Amanitaceae.

== Taxonomy ==
A. cinereopannosa was classified by Dutch mycologist Cornelis Bas in 1969.

== Description ==
The cap ranges from 8–18 centimetres (3 1/10–7 1/10 inches) in diameter, and is typically covered in brownish-gray warts. The cap starts out convex before expanding out to nearly flat, and is dull whitish to pale gray in color.

The mushroom is described to have an odor of biscuits when it is young, though it changes to one of faint chlorine as it ages.
