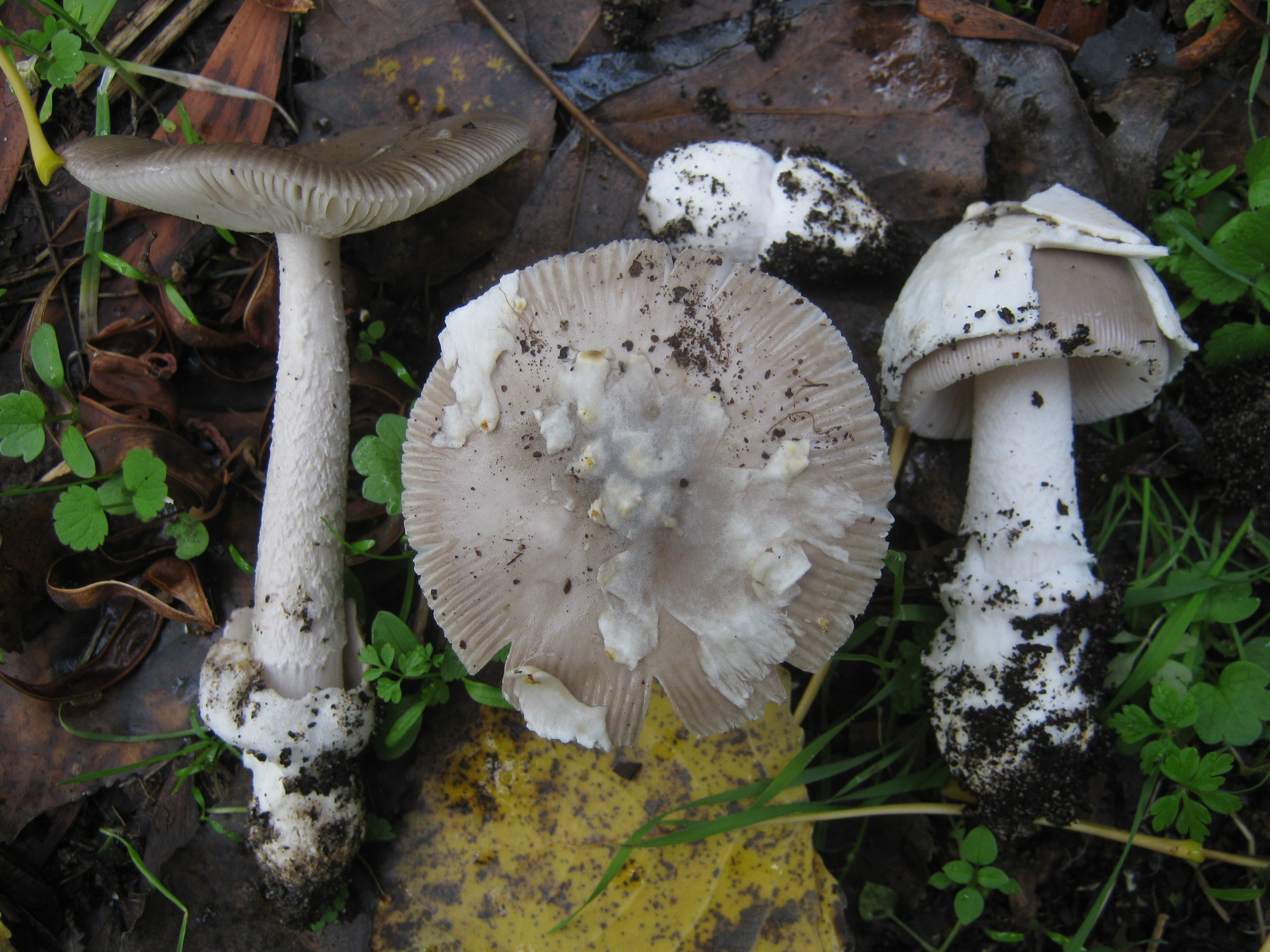

Scientific classification
- Kingdom: Fungi
- Division: Basidiomycota
- Class: Agaricomycetes
- Order: Agaricales
- Family: Amanitaceae
- Genus: Amanita
- Species: A. beckeri

Binomial name
- Amanita beckeri Huijsman 1962

= Amanita beckeri =

Species of fungus

Amanita beckeri or Becker's ringless amanita is a species of Amanita from Europe. It is named after Georges Becker (1905-1994), who identified it.
