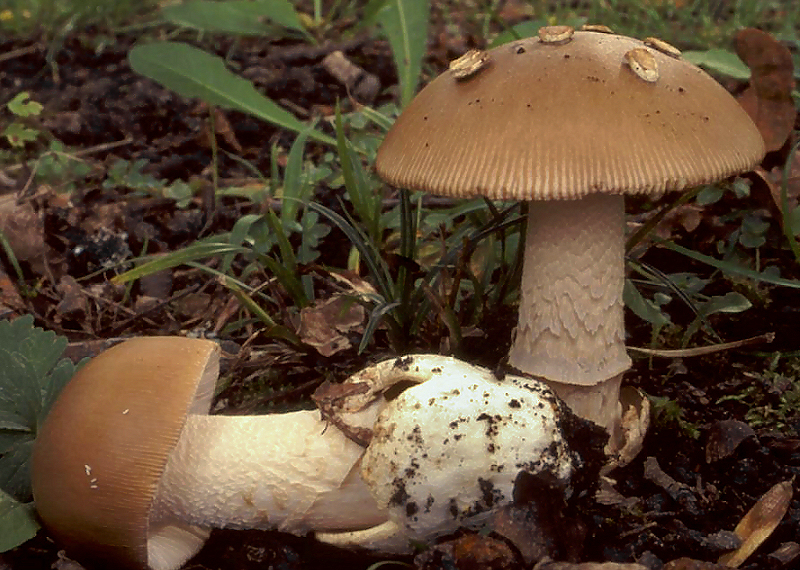

Scientific classification
- Kingdom: Fungi
- Division: Basidiomycota
- Class: Agaricomycetes
- Order: Agaricales
- Family: Amanitaceae
- Genus: Amanita
- Species: A. lividopallescens

Binomial name
- Amanita lividopallescens (Secr. ex Gillet) Boud. 1905.

Synonyms
- Amanita livida pallescens Secr. nom. inval. 1833.

= Amanita lividopallescens =

Species of fungus

Amanita lividopallescens, also known as the pale amanita, is a species of Amanita in Europe that grows near oaks.
