= Amanita masasiensis =

Scientific classification
- Kingdom: Fungi
- Division: Basidiomycota
- Class: Agaricomycetes
- Order: Agaricales
- Family: Amanitaceae
- Genus: Amanita
- Species: A. masasiensis

Binomial name
- Amanita masasiensis Härk. & Saarim, 1994

Amanita masasiensis is a mushroom of the family Amanitaceae. It is found in Africa and is traditionally consumed in Northern usually found in the Miombo woodland habitat Benin.

== Description ==
It small to medium in size and has a cap 40-120mm in diameter.
