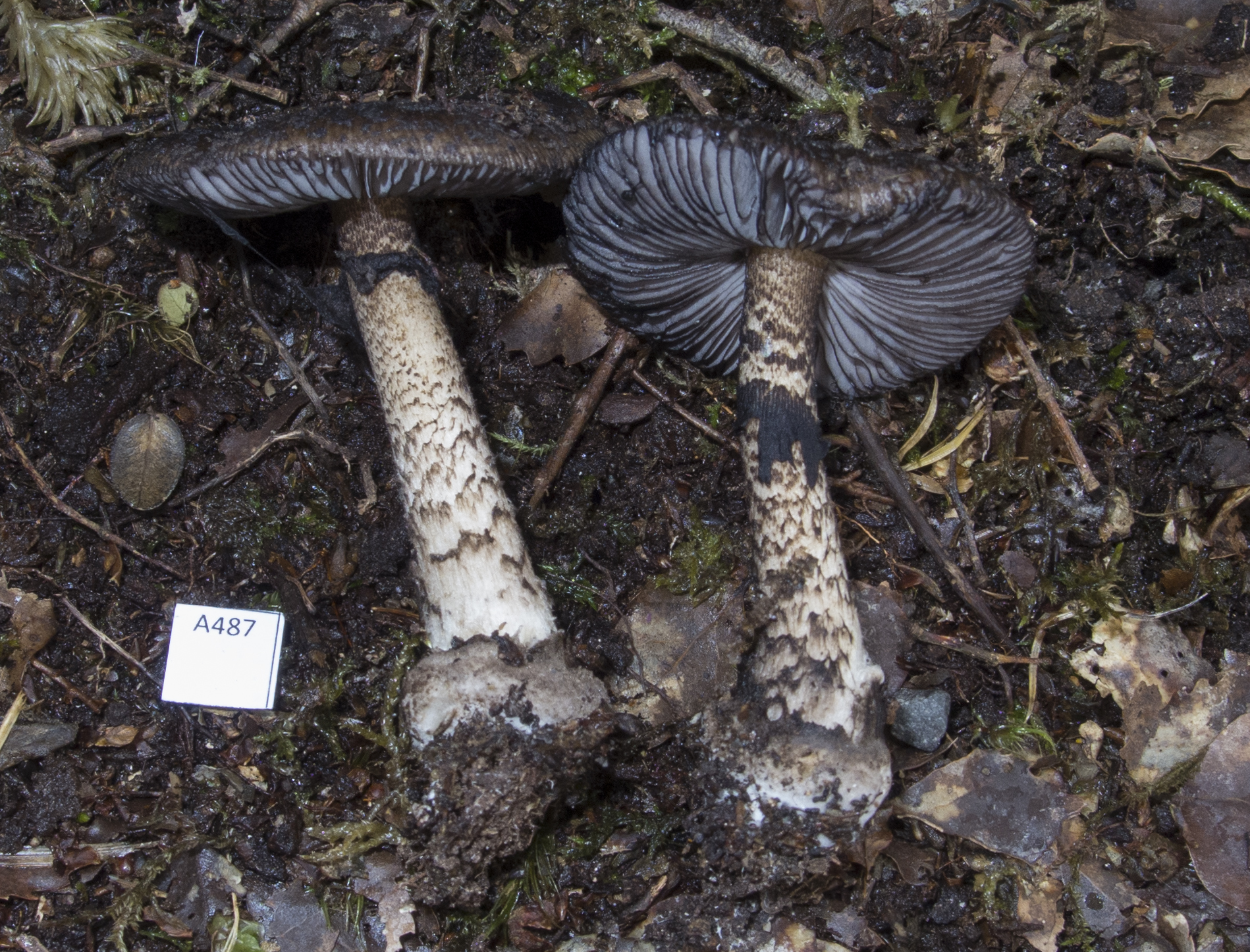

Scientific classification
- Kingdom: Fungi
- Division: Basidiomycota
- Class: Agaricomycetes
- Order: Agaricales
- Family: Amanitaceae
- Genus: Amanita
- Species: A. nigrescens

Binomial name
- Amanita nigrescens G. Stev. (1962)

= Amanita nigrescens =

Species of fungus

Amanita nigrescens, commonly known as blackening amanita, is a species of fungus in the Amanita genus. It has some similarities to Amanita pekeoides.

Amanita nigrescens has a moist, waxy cap with dark-brown warts. It has white gills that are free from the stem. It has white spores and a blackish-brown ring. It has a white volva with yellow-brown tints.

Amanita nigrescens is found in New Zealand and grows under Nothofagus trees.
