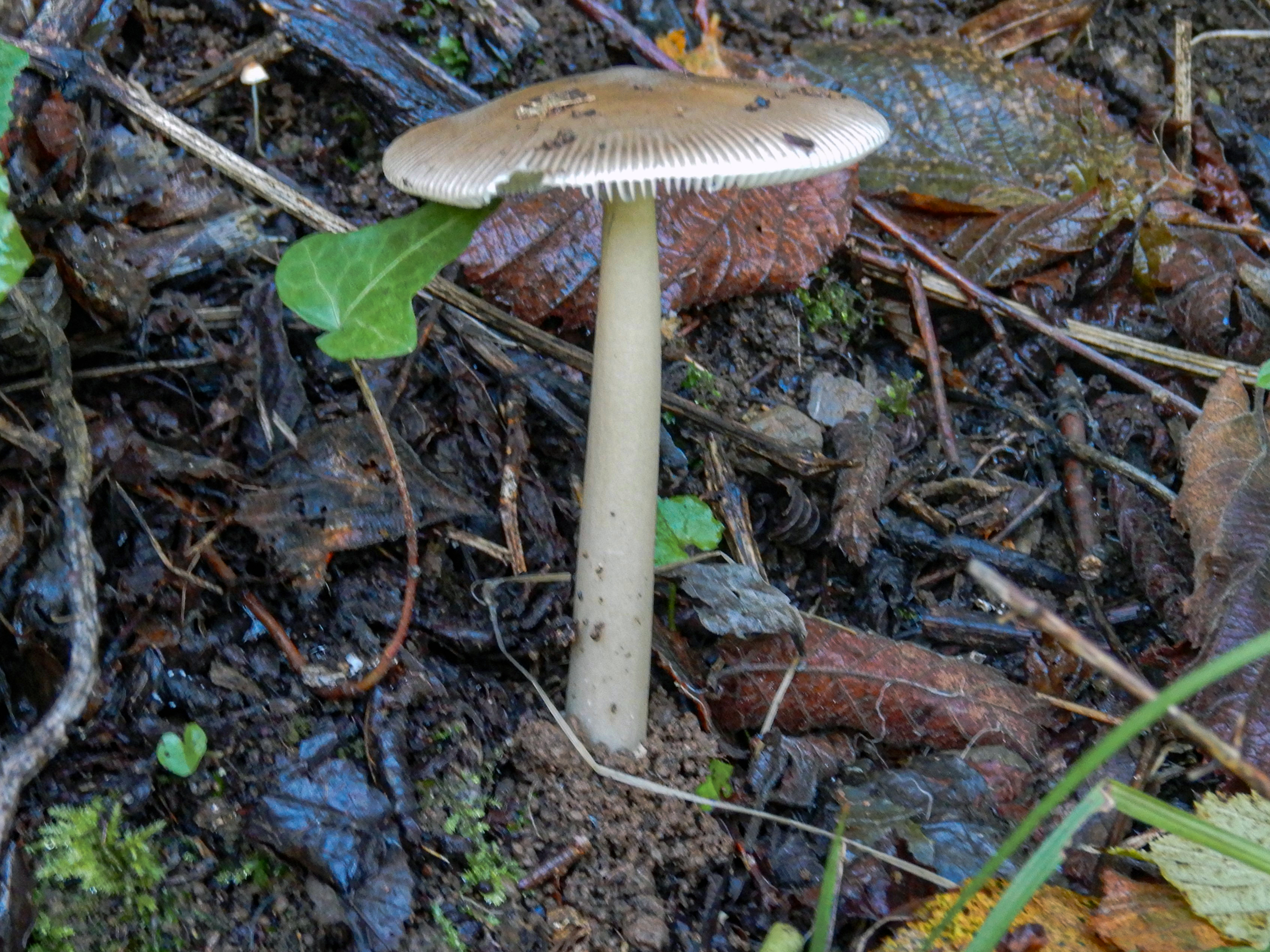

Scientific classification
- Kingdom: Fungi
- Division: Basidiomycota
- Class: Agaricomycetes
- Order: Agaricales
- Family: Amanitaceae
- Genus: Amanita
- Species: A. fulvoides

Binomial name
- Amanita fulvoides Neville & Poumarat

= Amanita fulvoides =

Species of fungus

Amanita fulvoides is a species of Amanita found in the Czech Republic, France, Germany, Greece, Italy, Portugal, Sweden and the United Kingdom. This species is found around running water around Carpinus betulus and Betula pendula.
