= Amanita bweyeyensis =

Scientific classification
- Kingdom: Fungi
- Division: Basidiomycota
- Class: Agaricomycetes
- Order: Agaricales
- Family: Amanitaceae
- Genus: Amanita
- Species: A. bweyeyensis

Binomial name
- Amanita bweyeyensis Fraiture, Raspé & Degreef (2019)

Species of mushroom

Amanita bweyeyensis is a novel species of Amanita discovered in 2019. Notably, it is famous for being edible, despite being in the phalloides section for Amanita, known for also containing the destroying angels.
