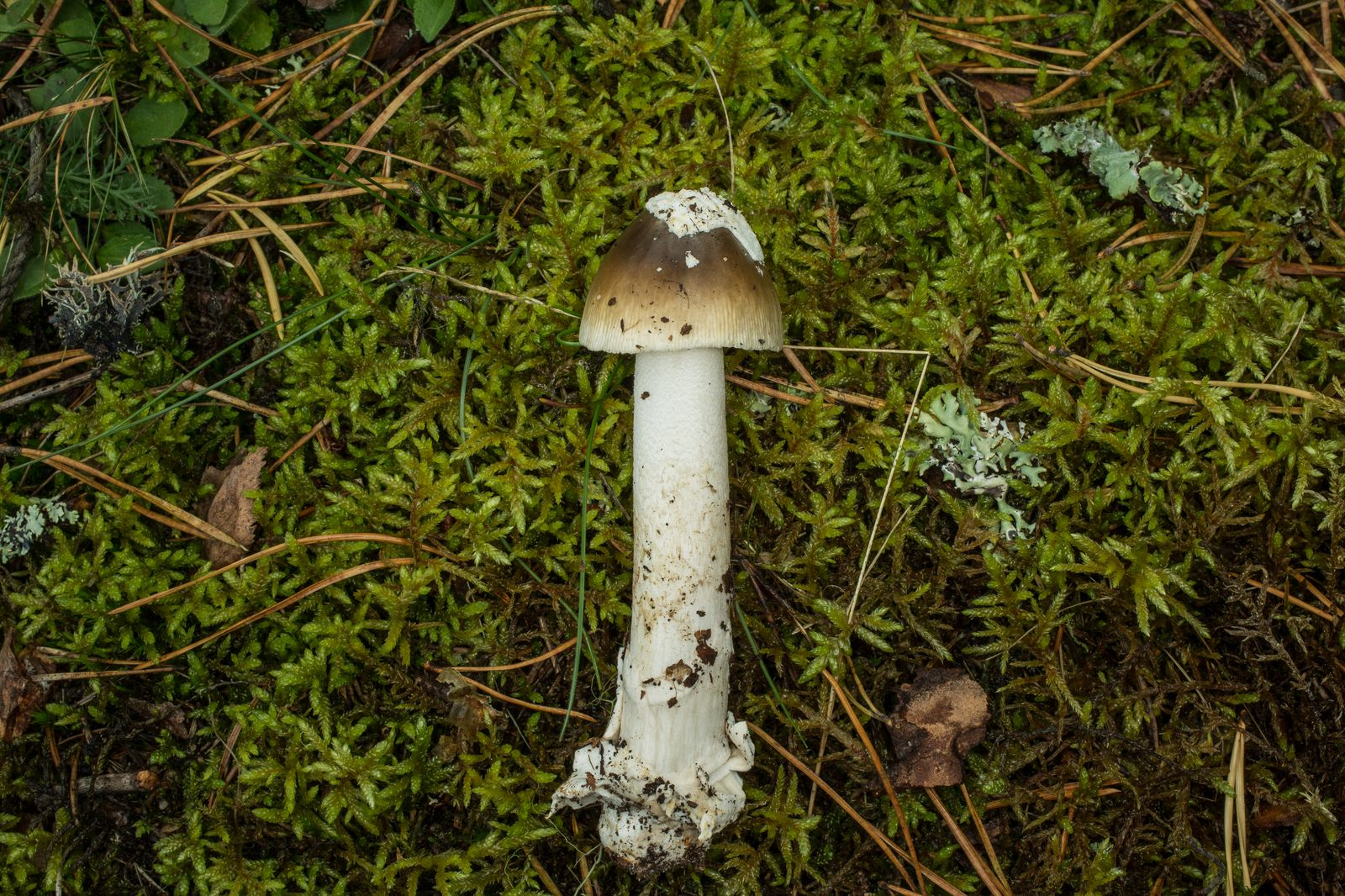

Scientific classification
- Domain: Eukaryota
- Kingdom: Fungi
- Division: Basidiomycota
- Class: Agaricomycetes
- Order: Agaricales
- Family: Amanitaceae
- Genus: Amanita
- Species: A. olivaceogrisea

Binomial name
- Amanita olivaceogrisea Kalamees 1986

= Amanita olivaceogrisea =

Species of fungus

Amanita olivaceogrisea is a species of Amanita found in England, Estonia, France, Latvia, and Sweden.
