= Amanita arenarioides =

Scientific classification
- Kingdom: Fungi
- Division: Basidiomycota
- Class: Agaricomycetes
- Order: Agaricales
- Family: Amanitaceae
- Genus: Amanita
- Species: A. arenarioides

Binomial name
- Amanita arenarioides Bougher, E.M.Davison & Giustiniano (2021)

Species of mushroom

Amanita arenarioides is a sequestrate mushroom in the genus Amanita. It can be found in Australia.

== Description ==
Amanita arenarioides is a very small, sequestrate mushroom with a white to ivory cap. It has an umbrella-shaped cap and a stripe that stains yellow, and a volva.

== Etymology ==
-Oides means like or resembling.
