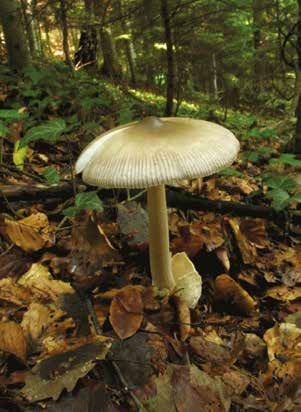

Scientific classification
- Domain: Eukaryota
- Kingdom: Fungi
- Division: Basidiomycota
- Class: Agaricomycetes
- Order: Agaricales
- Family: Amanitaceae
- Genus: Amanita
- Species: A. betulae

Binomial name
- Amanita betulae Neville & Poumarat, 2009

= Amanita betulae =

Species of fungus

Amanita betulae is a species of Amanita found in growing in birch and mixed hardwood in Europe
