= Amanita inculta =

Scientific classification
- Kingdom: Fungi
- Division: Basidiomycota
- Class: Agaricomycetes
- Order: Agaricales
- Family: Amanitaceae
- Genus: Amanita
- Species: A. inculta

Binomial name
- Amanita inculta (Bougher) Justo

Species of fungus

Amanita inculta Mycological characteristics
- Gills on hymenium
- Cap is conical
- Hymenium is free
- Stipe has a volva
- Spore print is white
- Ecology is mycorrhizal
- Edibility is unknown

Amanita inculta is a poorly known species from the Amanita genus. Amanita inculta is found growing in Western Australia. It forms relationships with trees like Eucalyptus.
