= A. crocea =

A. crocea may refer to:

- Alstroemeria crocea, a flowering plant
- Amanita crocea, an edible fungus
- Aphaenogaster crocea, a myrmicine ant
- Aptilosia crocea, a moth first described in 1911
- Atheropla crocea, a concealer moth
