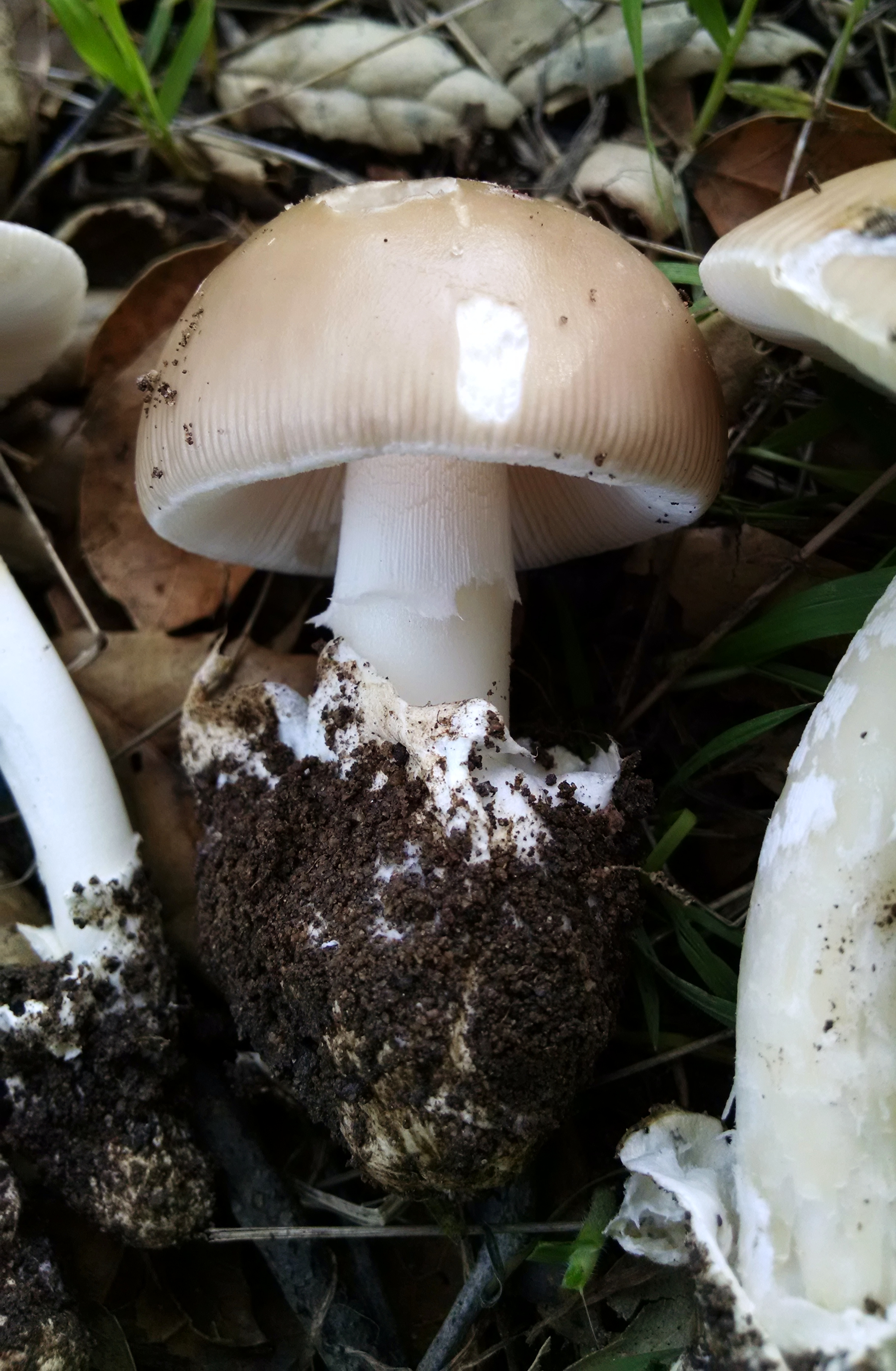

Scientific classification
- Kingdom: Fungi
- Division: Basidiomycota
- Class: Agaricomycetes
- Order: Agaricales
- Family: Amanitaceae
- Genus: Amanita
- Species: A. calyptratoides

Binomial name
- Amanita calyptratoides Peck 1909

= Amanita calyptratoides =

Species of fungus

Amanita Calyptratoides
- Mycological characteristics
- Gills on hymenium
- Cap is convex
- Hymenium is free
- Stipe has a volva
- Spore print is white
- Ecology is mycorrhizal
- Edibility is not recommended

Amanita calyptratoides, or Peck's candlestick amanita, is a species of Amanita found in southern California.

== Edibility ==
Consuming A. calyptratoides is strongly discouraged for beginners due to the high risk of misidentification with deadly Amanita species. There is no record of this species being widely consumed. However, some field guides list it as edible.
