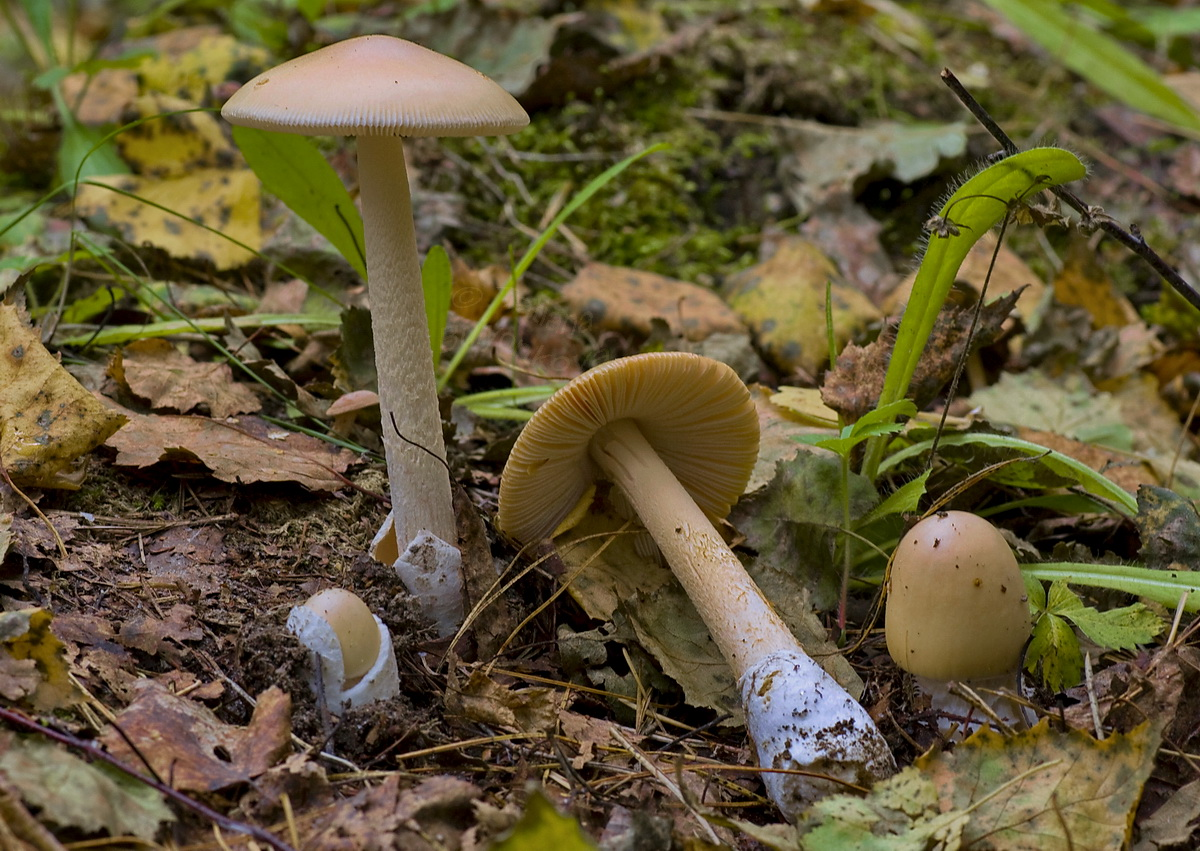

Scientific classification
- Kingdom: Fungi
- Division: Basidiomycota
- Class: Agaricomycetes
- Order: Agaricales
- Family: Amanitaceae
- Genus: Amanita
- Species: A. flavescens

Binomial name
- Amanita flavescens Murrill 1951

= Amanita flavescens =

Species of fungus

Amanita flavescens is a species of Amanita found in Sweden and Norway.
