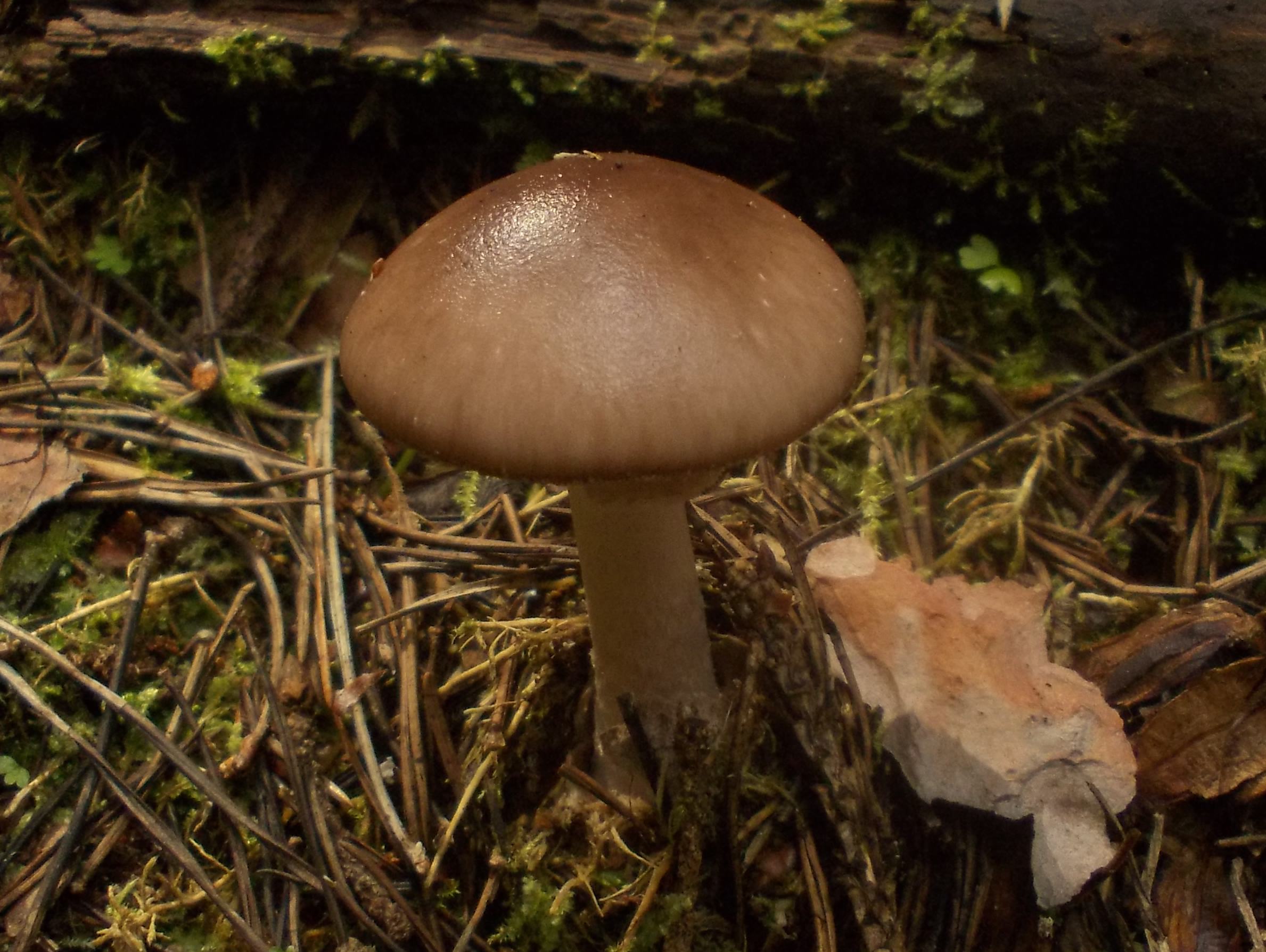

Conservation status
- Secure (NatureServe)

Scientific classification
- Kingdom: Fungi
- Division: Basidiomycota
- Class: Agaricomycetes
- Order: Agaricales
- Family: Amanitaceae
- Genus: Amanita
- Species: A. porphyria

Binomial name
- Amanita porphyria Alb. & Schwein. : Fr.

Synonyms
- Agaricus porphyreus (Alb. & Schwein.) Fr., Syst. mycol. (Lundae) 1: 14 (1821); Agaricus recutitus Fr., Epicr. syst. mycol. (Uppsala): 6 (1838); Amanita recutita (Fr.) Gillet, Hyménomycètes (Alençon): 42 (1874)

= Amanita porphyria =

Species of fungus

Amanita porphyria
- Mycological characteristics
- Gills on hymenium
- Cap is convex
- Hymenium is free
- Stipe has a ring and volva
- Spore print is white
- Ecology is mycorrhizal
- Edibility is inedible

Amanita porphyria, also known as the grey veiled amanita or the porphyry amanita, is a fairly common, inedible mushroom of the genus Amanita found in Europe and North America.

== Taxonomy ==
This fungus was described in 1805 under the current name, Amanita porphyria, by Johannes Baptista von Albertini and Lewis David de Schweinitz in their work Conspectus Fungorum in Lusatiae superioris agro Niskiensi crescentium e methodo Persooniana ("An overview of fungi growing in the area of Niesky in Upper Lusatia, according to the methodology of Persoon"). The name was then sanctioned by Elias Magnus Fries, meaning that the name Amanita porphyria is given priority even if the normal nomenclatural rules would give precedence to another name – and indeed the Danish mycologist Heinrich Christian Friedrich Schumacher had already described the same species as Agaricus gracilis in 1803. The sanctioning can be shown in the author string by means of a colon as in the following: "A. porphyria Alb. & Schwein. : Fr."

The epithet porphyria comes from the Ancient Greek word porphúra (πορφύρα), meaning the Tyrian purple dye. This colour may be seen in the cap of the mushroom (though it is not always evident).

== Description ==
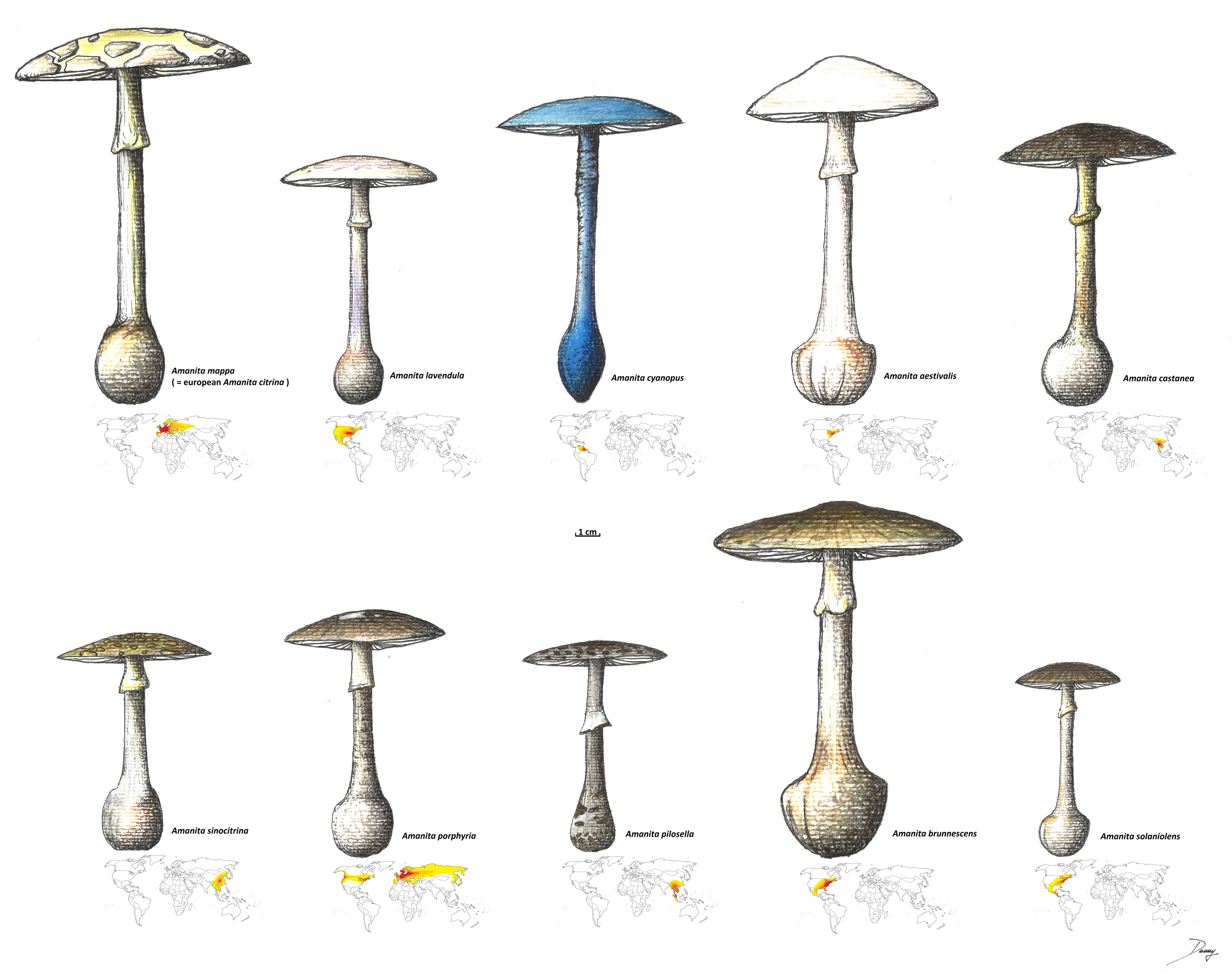
Mushrooms in the Amanita citrina group. A. porphyria is in the bottom row, second from the left.

The smooth cap is hemispherical when young and later flat, sometimes with grey patches of veil. It is about 4–10 centimetres (1 1/2–4 inches) in diameter, and brown with either a purplish or a greyish hue. As is normal in the genus, the gills are whitish and free from the stem and the spores are white. The gills darken when bruised.

The stem is 5–12 cm high and 0.6–1.5 cm thick, with a basal bulb which may or may not be surrounded by a white membranous volva. The fragile ring is grey-violet or blackened.

The flesh is white with a smell of raw potato or radish. The amyloid spores are almost spherical with a diameter of 8–10 μm.

=== Similar species ===
A. porphyria is similar in overall shape and smell to the very common A. citrina, but the cap colour is different and the ring has a grey/violet coloration. It can also be confused with the panther cap (A. pantherina)

== Distribution and habitat ==
A. porphyria usually grows on poor soil under coniferous trees, especially spruce, but also fir, hemlock, and some deciduous ones such as birch. It is mycorrhizal, living in symbiosis with the trees.

It occurs from summer to autumn and is commoner in mountains or further to the north. In Europe it is very common in boreal or hemiboreal forests but less so in temperate areas. It is also found in northern North America from east to west. There was some uncertainty whether North American specimens should really be classified under a different name, but there is now firm DNA evidence that all the variants actually belong to the same species. It has also been recorded in Australia.

== Toxicity ==
A. porphyria is not suitable for consumption. More importantly, it can easily be confused with much more poisonous species, such as A. phalloides (the death cap).

== See also ==
- List of Amanita species
