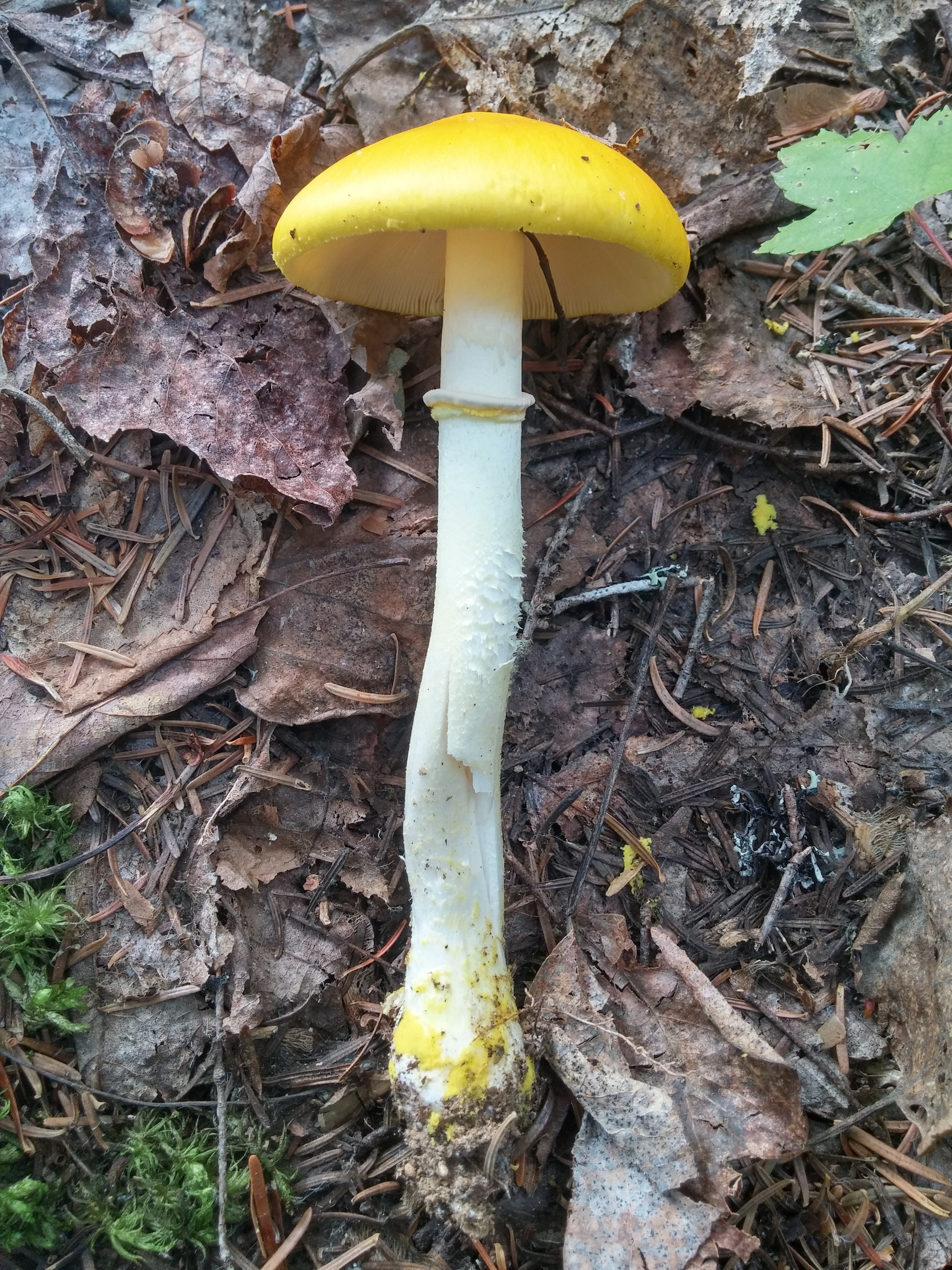

Scientific classification
- Kingdom: Fungi
- Division: Basidiomycota
- Class: Agaricomycetes
- Order: Agaricales
- Family: Amanitaceae
- Genus: Amanita
- Species: A. elongata

Binomial name
- Amanita elongata Peck 1909

= Amanita elongata =

Species of fungus

Amanita elongata
- Mycological characteristics
- Gills on hymenium
- Cap is convex or flat
- Hymenium is free
- Stipe has a ring and volva
- Spore print is white
- Ecology is mycorrhizal
- Edibility is unknown

Amanita elongata or Peck's yellow dust amanita is a species of Amanita from Northeastern United States and Canada.
