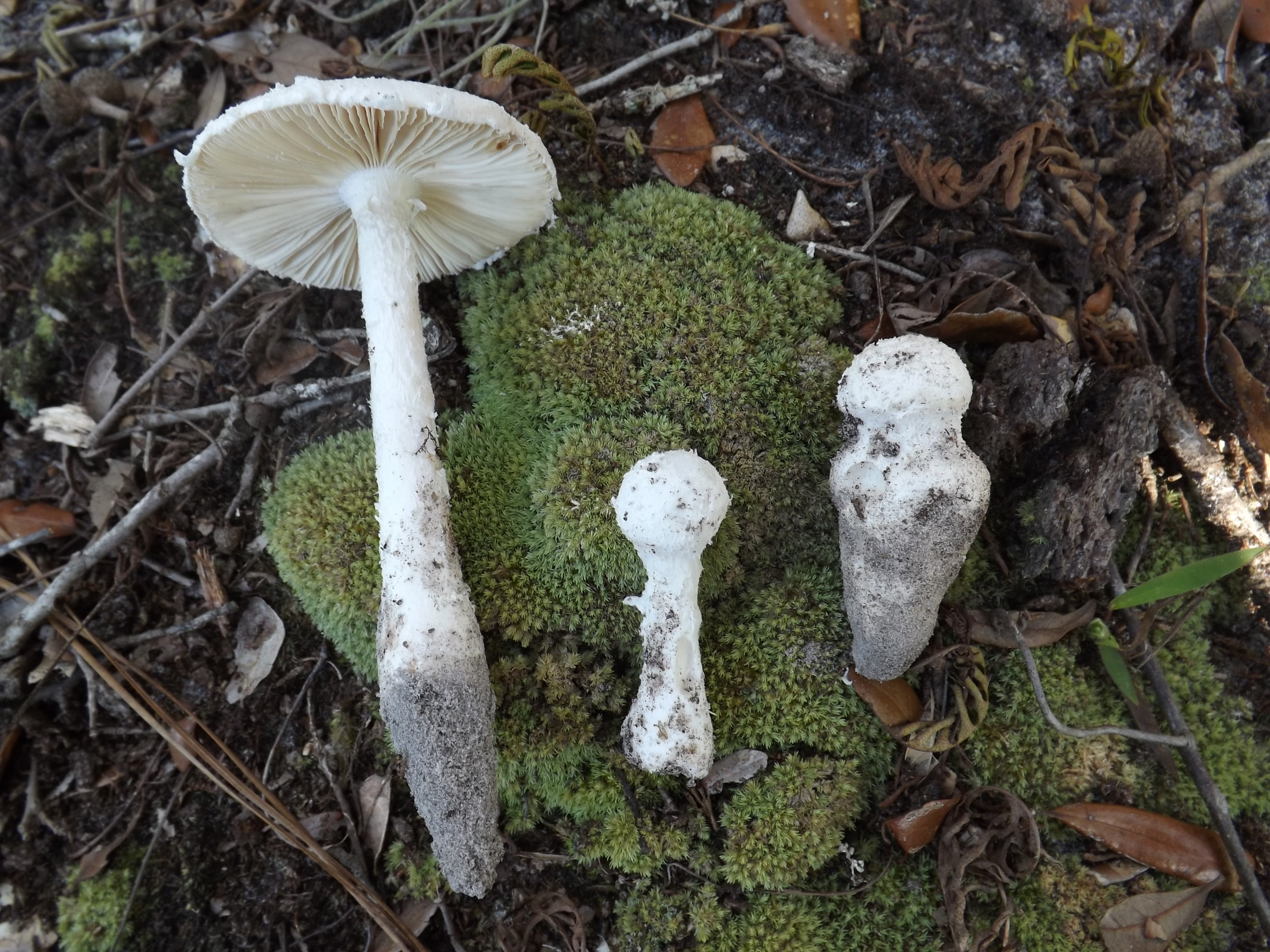
- Several Amanita longipes fungi found growing at Ocala National Forest, Marion Co., Florida, United States.

Scientific classification
- Domain: Eukaryota
- Kingdom: Fungi
- Division: Basidiomycota
- Class: Agaricomycetes
- Order: Agaricales
- Family: Amanitaceae
- Genus: Amanita
- Species: A. longipes

Binomial name
- Amanita longipes Bas ex Tulloss & Dav.T. Jenkins

= Amanita longipes =

Species of fungus

Amanita longipes Mycological characteristics
- Gills on hymenium
- Cap is umbonate
- Hymenium is free
- Stipe has a ring and volva
- Spore print is white
- Ecology is mycorrhizal
- Edibility is unknown

Amanita longipes is a small mushroom species of the Amanita genus. It feeds on decaying leaves of some woods and can be found around the Appalachian Mountains. It is a food source for various insects.

== Description ==
=== Cap ===
The cap is typically around 2.4–10.2 centimetres (1–4 inches) wide, is hemispheric at first then becoming broadly convex to plano-convex, occasionally also slightly depressed in center; white, pallid grayish-brown or grayish buff over disk in age, surface dull and tacky at first and becoming shiny.

=== Gills ===
The gills are usually narrowly adnate, sometimes with a decurrent line, close, whitish, becoming grayish-cream on drying, with white, floccose remnants of partial veil on edges, narrow, 4.5–11 mm (1/8–3/8 in) broad, sometimes anastomosing; the short gills are truncate to rounded truncate to attenuate to attenuate in steps, plentiful, of diverse lengths, unevenly distributed.

=== Stem ===
The stem is 2.5–14.2 cm (1–5 1/2 in) × 0.5–2 cm (1/4–3/4 in), white, and tapers upward slightly to a flaring apex. The stem is decorated with easily removed, floccose material especially in upper portion; the flesh of the stem usually does not take on a color when bruised. The flesh is white, occasionally graying in damaged areas, with a firmly stuffed central cylinder, up to 7 mm wide. The ring is fibrous-floccose and rapidly evanescent. Volval remnants are absent from the bulb and the stem base or difficult to distinguish.

== Toxicity ==
One guide lists this species' edibility as unknown but doubtful. It should be avoided as many species of the genus are deadly.
