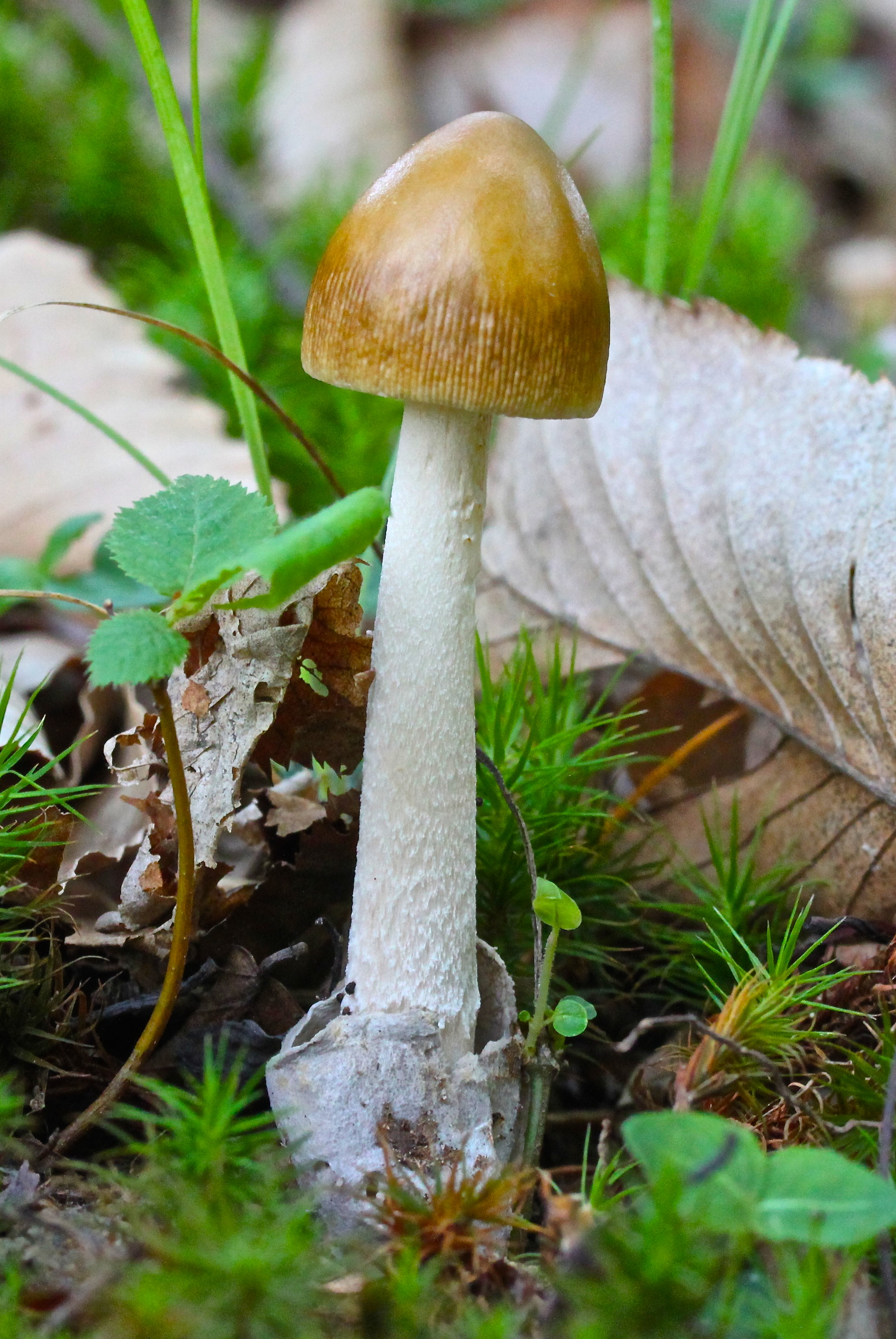

Scientific classification
- Domain: Eukaryota
- Kingdom: Fungi
- Division: Basidiomycota
- Class: Agaricomycetes
- Order: Agaricales
- Family: Amanitaceae
- Genus: Amanita
- Species: A. sinicoflava

Binomial name
- Amanita sinicoflava Tulloss (1988)

= Amanita sinicoflava =

Species of fungus

Amanita sinicoflava Mycological characteristics
- Gills on hymenium
- Cap is convex
- Hymenium is free
- Stipe has a volva
- Spore print is white
- Ecology is mycorrhizal
- Edibility is edible but not recommended

Amanita sinicoflava, the mandarin yellow ringless amanita, is an edible species of fungus in the large genus Amanita.

Fruitbodies have yellow-olivaceous or olive-tan caps that measure 2.5–7 centimetres (1–3 inches) in diameter. There are grooves on the cap margin that extend about 40% of the distance from the margin to the apex. The spores are spherical or nearly so, typically measuring 9.1 to 12.2 micrometres (0.36 to 0.48 mils) by 8.4 to 11.5 μm (0.33 to 0.45 mils). The white stipe is ornamented with slightly darker fibrils, and there are sac-like remnants of the volva at the stipe base. The specific epithet sinicoflava means "Chinese-yellow", referring to the cap color.

Found in North America, the fungus was described as new to science in 1998 by mycologist Rodham Tulloss. The type collections were made in Sussex County, New Jersey. The mushroom grows in sandy soil under Quercus, Pinus rigida, Acer rubrum, Quercus alba, and Quercus velutina.

== See also ==
- List of Amanita species
