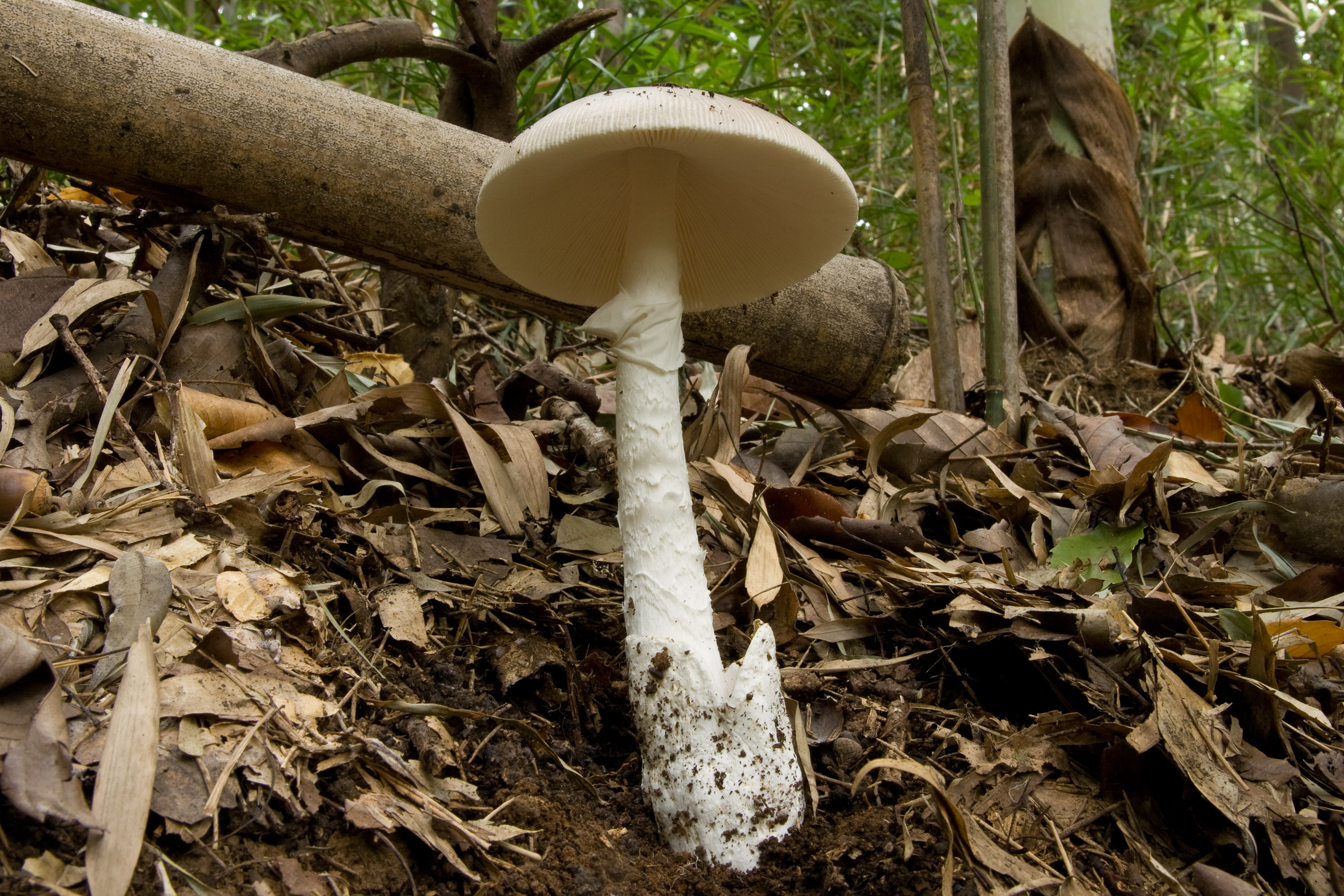

Scientific classification
- Kingdom: Fungi
- Division: Basidiomycota
- Class: Agaricomycetes
- Order: Agaricales
- Family: Amanitaceae
- Genus: Amanita
- Species: A. spreta

Binomial name
- Amanita spreta (Peck) Sacc.

= Amanita spreta =

Species of fungus

Amanita spreta
- Mycological characteristics
- Gills on hymenium
- Cap is umbonate
- Hymenium is free
- Stipe has a volva
- Spore print is white
- Ecology is mycorrhizal
- Edibility is unknown but not recommended

Amanita spreta or the hated amanita is a species of mushroom in the genus Amanita.

== Description ==
A. spreta is usually distinguished by its grayish brown cap with dark, radial streaks; its medium to large size, the presence of a ring on the upper stem, and its stem base, in which it features a white, sacklike volva and is not prominently swollen. Its ellipsoid, inamyloid spores also help to distinguish it.

=== Cap ===
The cap measures around 5.8–15.4 centimetres (2 1/4–6 inches) wide, with whitish or pallid tints of gray and/or brown at first, often darkening to gray-brown or brown-gray, often darkest in the center, often white or nearly white at the margin, having minute colorless spots and/or giving the impression of densely placed radial fibers embedded in the cap skin. In addition, the cap is broadly campanulate to plano-convex, and eventually has a large umbo in a slight depression. The cap is viscid to tacky and dull to shiny to subshiny with drying, and it has a decurved, short-striate margin. The volva is either absent or present as white to pale gray, scant, irregular patches, soft to smooth, easily removable, and membranous. The flesh is white, pale brown under the cap skin in the center, is 8–17 millimetres (1/2–1/2 in) thick over the stem, and is thinning evenly nearing the margin.

=== Gills ===
The gills are free, receding at maturity, very crowded to crowded, pale cream to cream to white, 8–19 mm broad, broadest at the midpoint, anastomosing, with faint and short decurrent lines on the top of the stem, and with a minutely powdery edge. The short gills are truncate to rounded truncate to subtruncate, unevenly distributed, of diverse lengths, and plentiful (sometimes more plentiful than full-length gills). The short gills can be adjacent to the stipe or adjacent to the cap margin or neither.

=== Stem ===
The stem of A. spreta is 5–10 cm long, up to 2 cm thick, tapering slightly to apex, is whitish, sometimes discoloring a little brownish; finely hairy to shaggy; with a white, skirtlike ring that may discolor brownish; with a slightly enlarged but not bulbous base that is set in a sack-like, flaring or lobed, white volva.

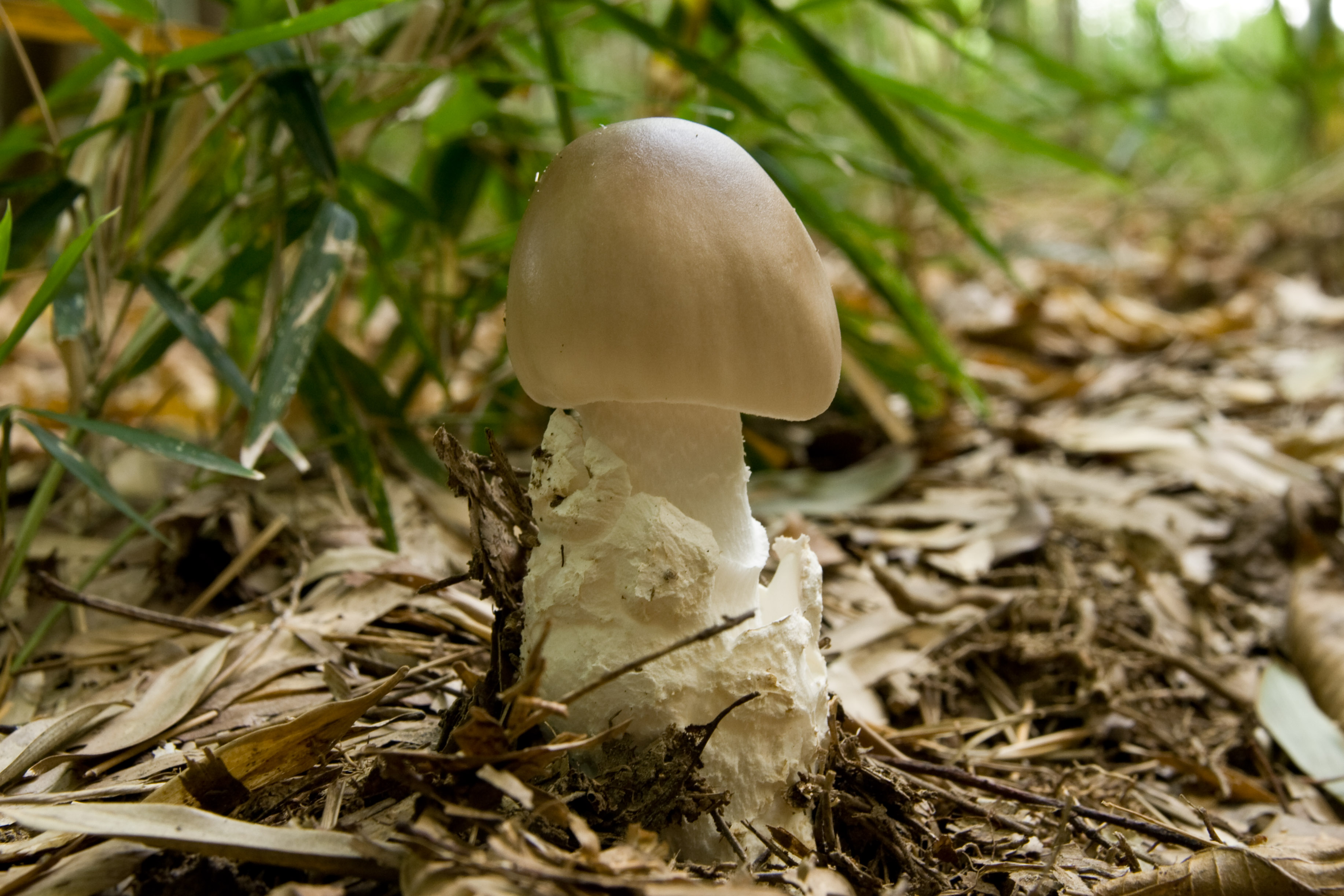

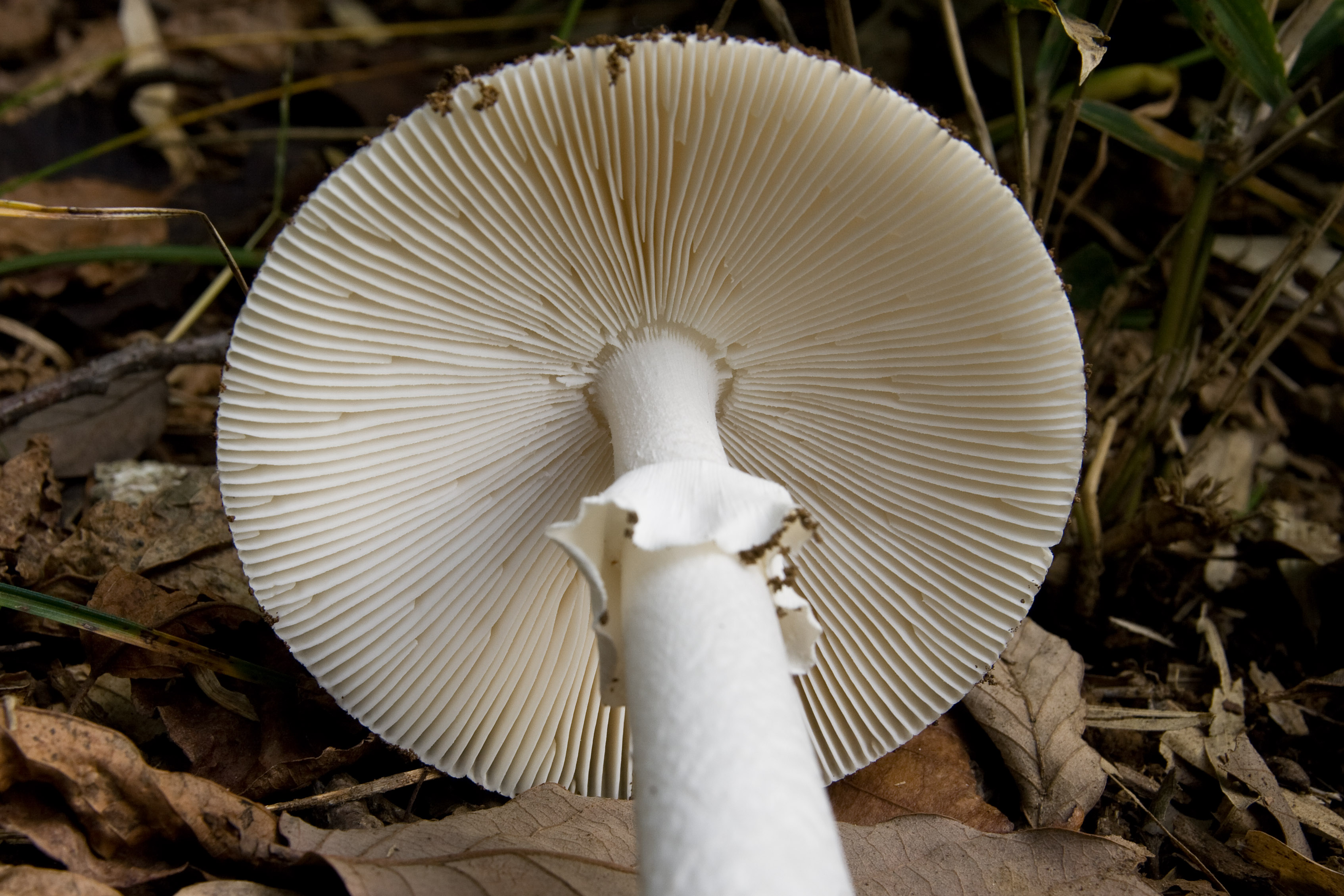

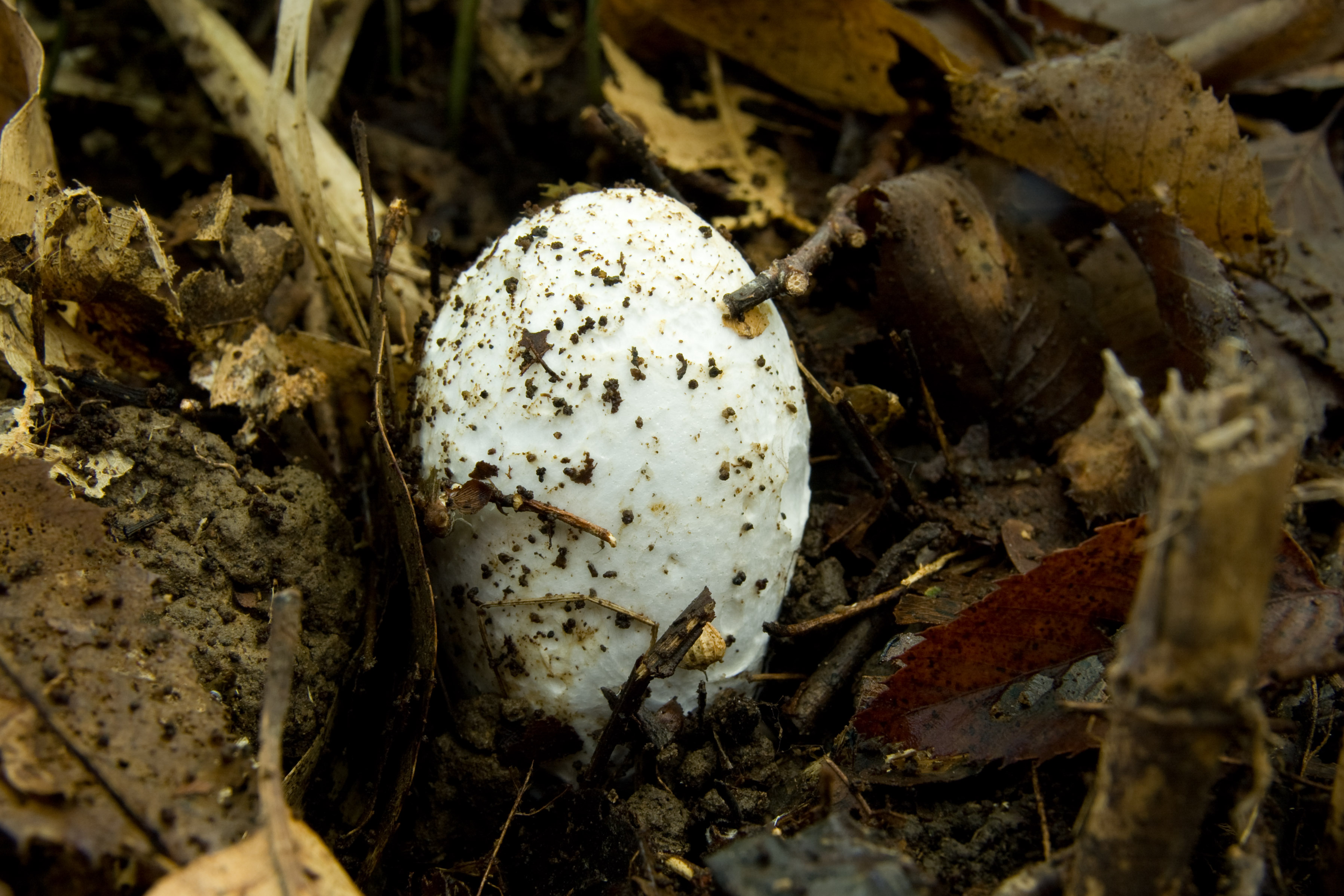

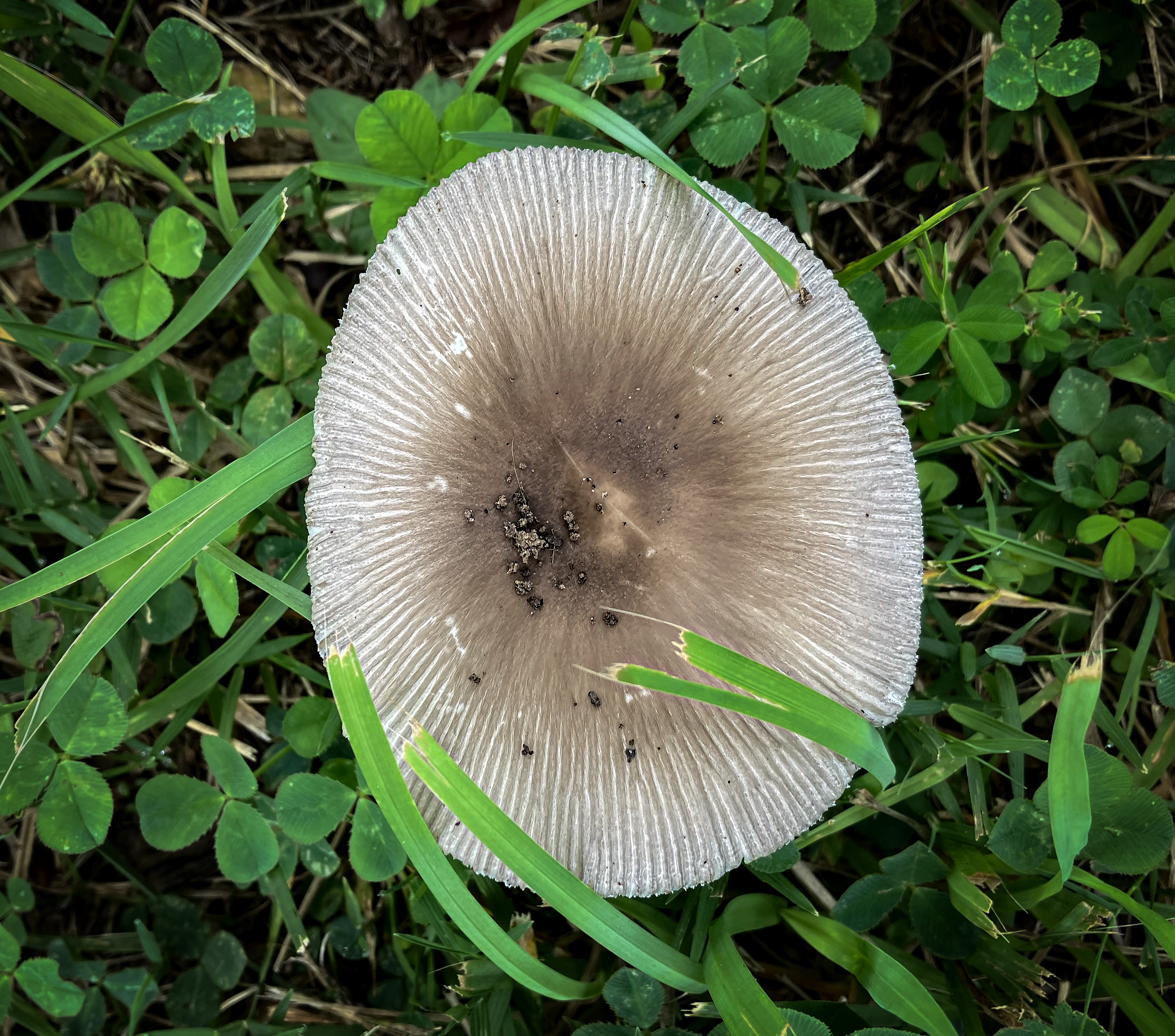

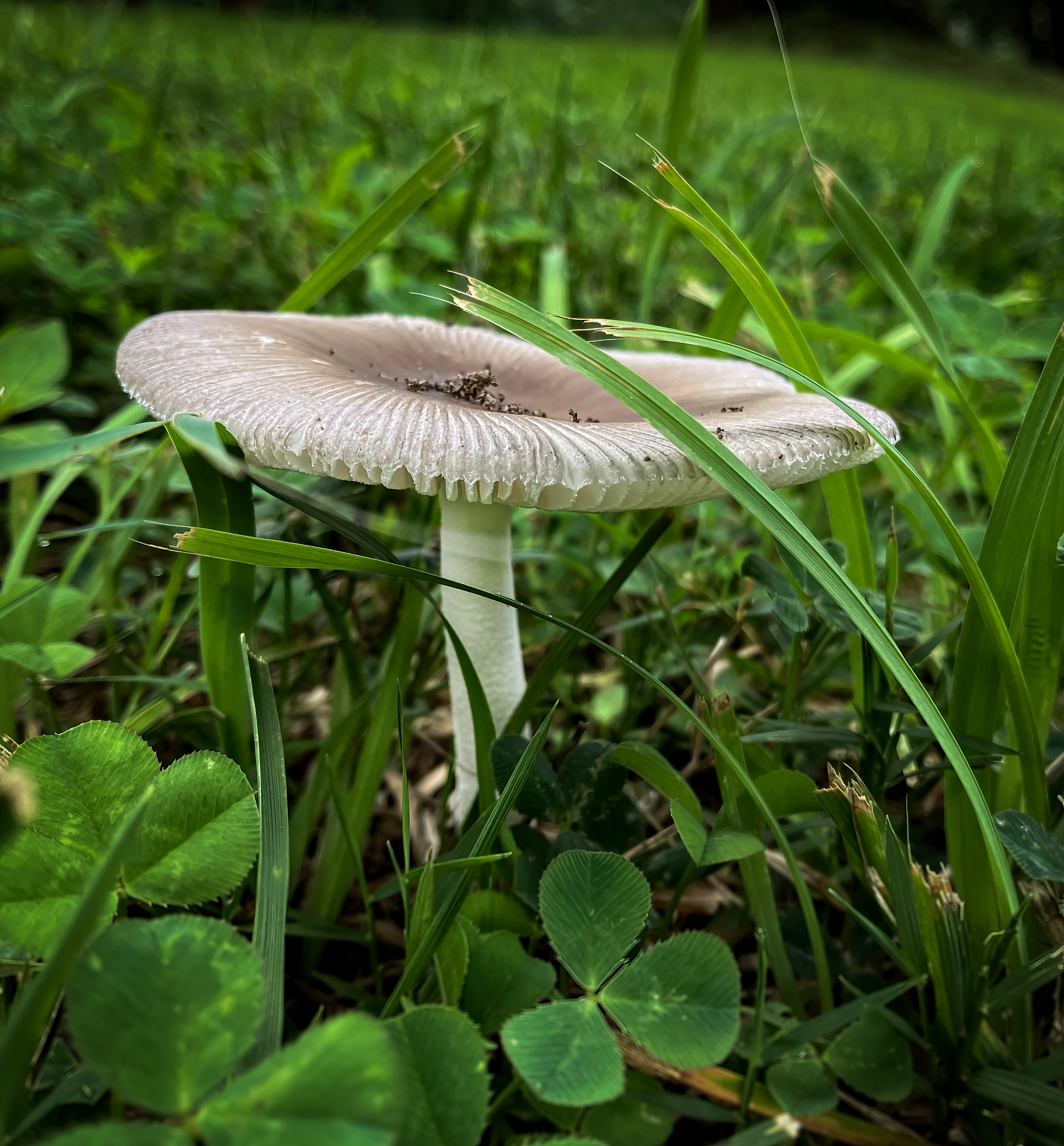

== Edibility ==
It has been said the Hated Caesar is edible, but unpleasant taste of the species makes it unpalatable. There is no reliable data on its edibility. This species is not suitable for consumption due to its resemblance to deadly amanita species such as Amanita phalloides.
