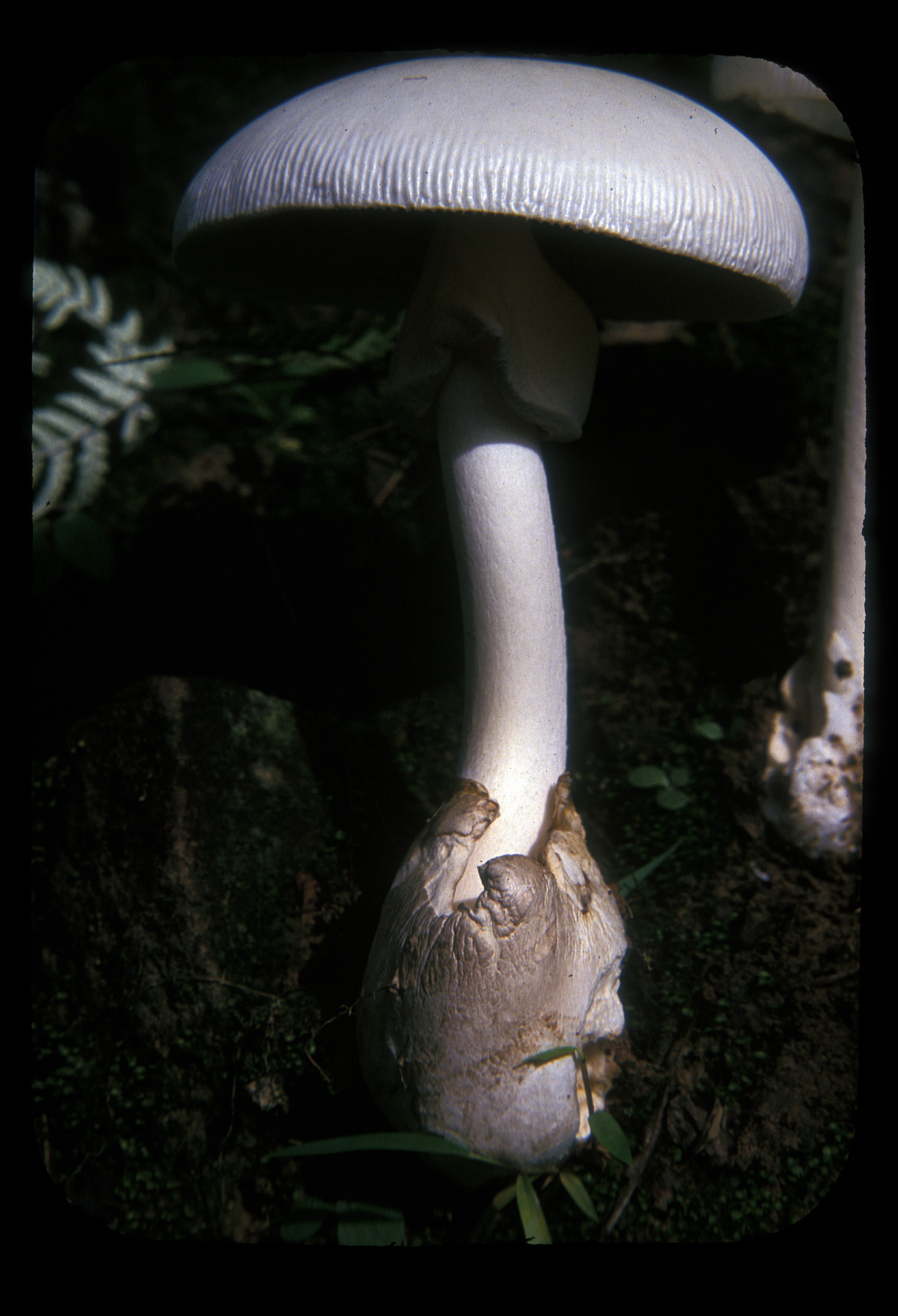

Scientific classification
- Domain: Eukaryota
- Kingdom: Fungi
- Division: Basidiomycota
- Class: Agaricomycetes
- Order: Agaricales
- Family: Amanitaceae
- Genus: Amanita
- Species: A. chepangiana

Binomial name
- Amanita chepangiana Tulloss & Bhandary

= Amanita chepangiana =

Species of fungus

Amanita chepangiana, commonly known as the Chepang slender Caesar, is a species of agaric fungus in the family Amanitaceae native to China and southern Asia.

In parts of Yunnan, China, the species is traditionally consumed. However, toxicity analysis found out at least one type of amatoxin and phallotoxin each within the species. Since it is difficult to distinguish from other lethal species, human consumption is generally not recommended.
