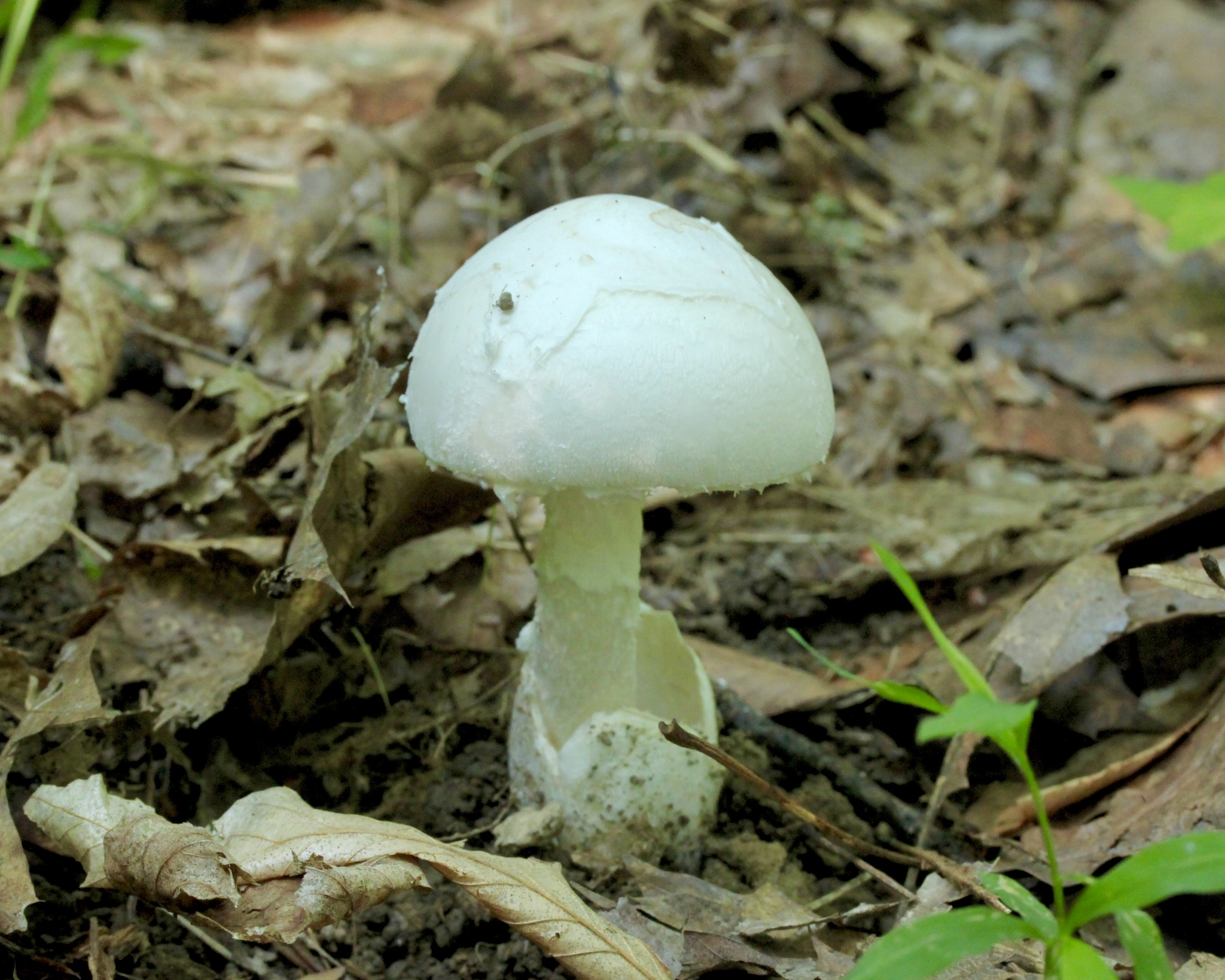

Scientific classification
- Domain: Eukaryota
- Kingdom: Fungi
- Division: Basidiomycota
- Class: Agaricomycetes
- Order: Agaricales
- Family: Amanitaceae
- Genus: Amanita
- Species: A. volvata

Binomial name
- Amanita volvata (Peck), Lloyd

= Amanita volvata =

Species of fungus

Amanita volvata Mycological characteristics
- Gills on hymenium
- Cap is convex or flat
- Hymenium is free
- Stipe has a volva
- Spore print is white
- Ecology is mycorrhizal
- Edibility is unknown

Amanita volvata, also known as volvate amanita is an inedible white-coloured species of fungi from the family Amanitaceae found in the southeastern United States. Can be confused with Amanita ponderosa, but that species is from the Iberian peninsula. The species is amyloid and have saccate volva, and elliptic spores.

== See also ==
- List of Amanita species
