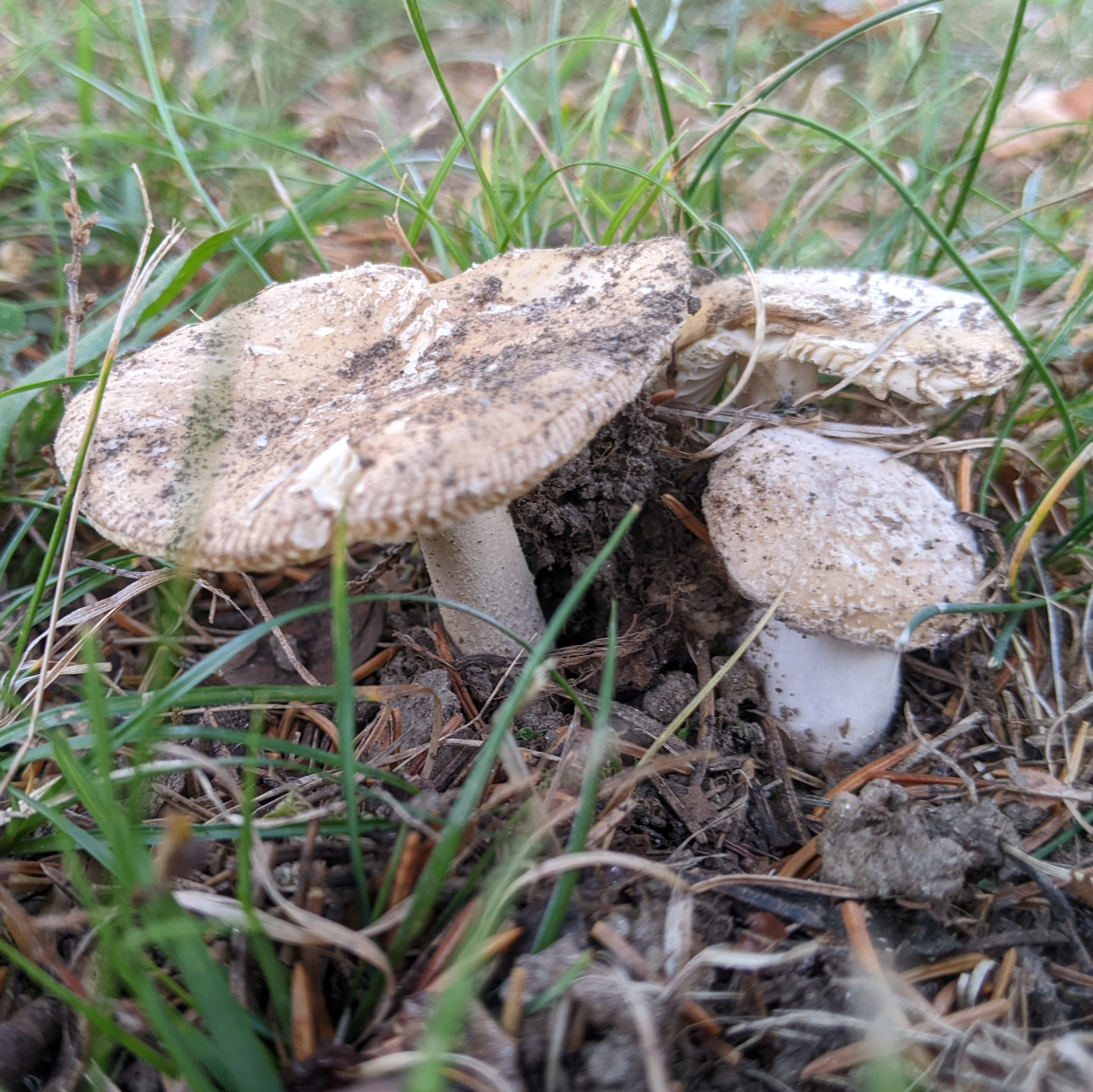

Scientific classification
- Domain: Eukaryota
- Kingdom: Fungi
- Division: Basidiomycota
- Class: Agaricomycetes
- Order: Agaricales
- Family: Amanitaceae
- Genus: Amanita
- Species: A. crenulata

Binomial name
- Amanita crenulata Peck (1900a)

= Amanita crenulata =

Toxic species of mushroom

Amanita crenulata Mycological characteristics
- Gills on hymenium
- Cap is flat
- Hymenium is adnate
- Stipe has a ring
- Spore print is white
- Ecology is mycorrhizal
- Edibility is poisonous or psychoactive

Amanita crenulata, also known as the poison champagne amanita, is a species of fungus that is very common in the Northeast United States.

== Description ==
- Cap: 2 – 9 cm wide, hemispheric at first, then becoming flatter. Pale tan, sometimes grayish or yellowish. The volva is distributed over the wide cap as powdery, somewhat paler warts. The color of the warts lends the mushroom the name "champagne."
- Gills: narrowly adnate, close to subcrowded, and white to cream. The short gills are truncate to subtruncate or (occasionally) subattenuate.
- Stipe: The stipe is 17 - 100 × 3.5 - 16 mm and has a skirt-like annulus that is often quickly lost or left in torn fragments on the pileus margin. The notable bulb usually bears a distinct ring of champagne volval powder on its "shoulder."
- Odour: Not distinct.

It is an ectomycorrhizal fungus, living in root symbiosis with a tree.

== Biochemistry ==
Amanita crenulata when ingested can produce symptoms associated with ibotenic acid/muscimol toxicity.

== See also ==
- List of Amanita species
