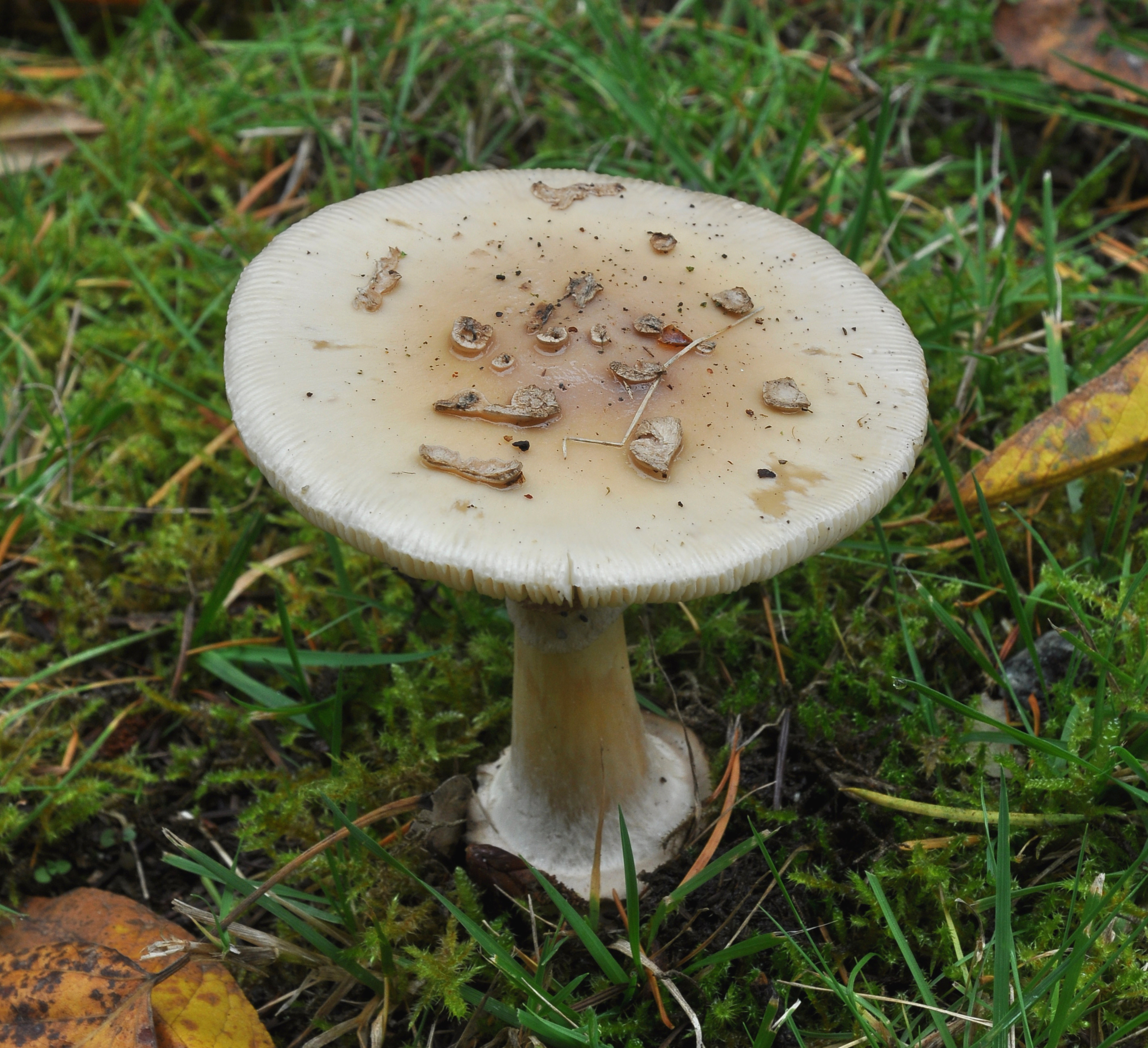

Scientific classification
- Kingdom: Fungi
- Division: Basidiomycota
- Class: Agaricomycetes
- Order: Agaricales
- Family: Amanitaceae
- Genus: Amanita
- Species: A. citrina

Binomial name
- Amanita citrina (Schaeff.) Pers., 1797

Synonyms
- Amanita mappa (Batsch) Bertill.

= Amanita citrina =

Species of fungus

Amanita citrina
- Mycological characteristics
- Gills on hymenium
- Cap is flat
- Hymenium is free
- Stipe has a ring and volva
- Spore print is white
- Ecology is mycorrhizal
- Edibility is poisonous or psychoactive

Amanita citrina (synonym Amanita mappa), commonly known as the false death cap or citron amanita, is a basidiomycotic mushroom. It grows in silicate soil in the summer and autumn months. It bears a pale yellow or sometimes white cap, with white stem, ring and volva. It is an inedible mushroom due to its toxicity, but is more pertinently often confused for the lethal death cap.

== Description ==
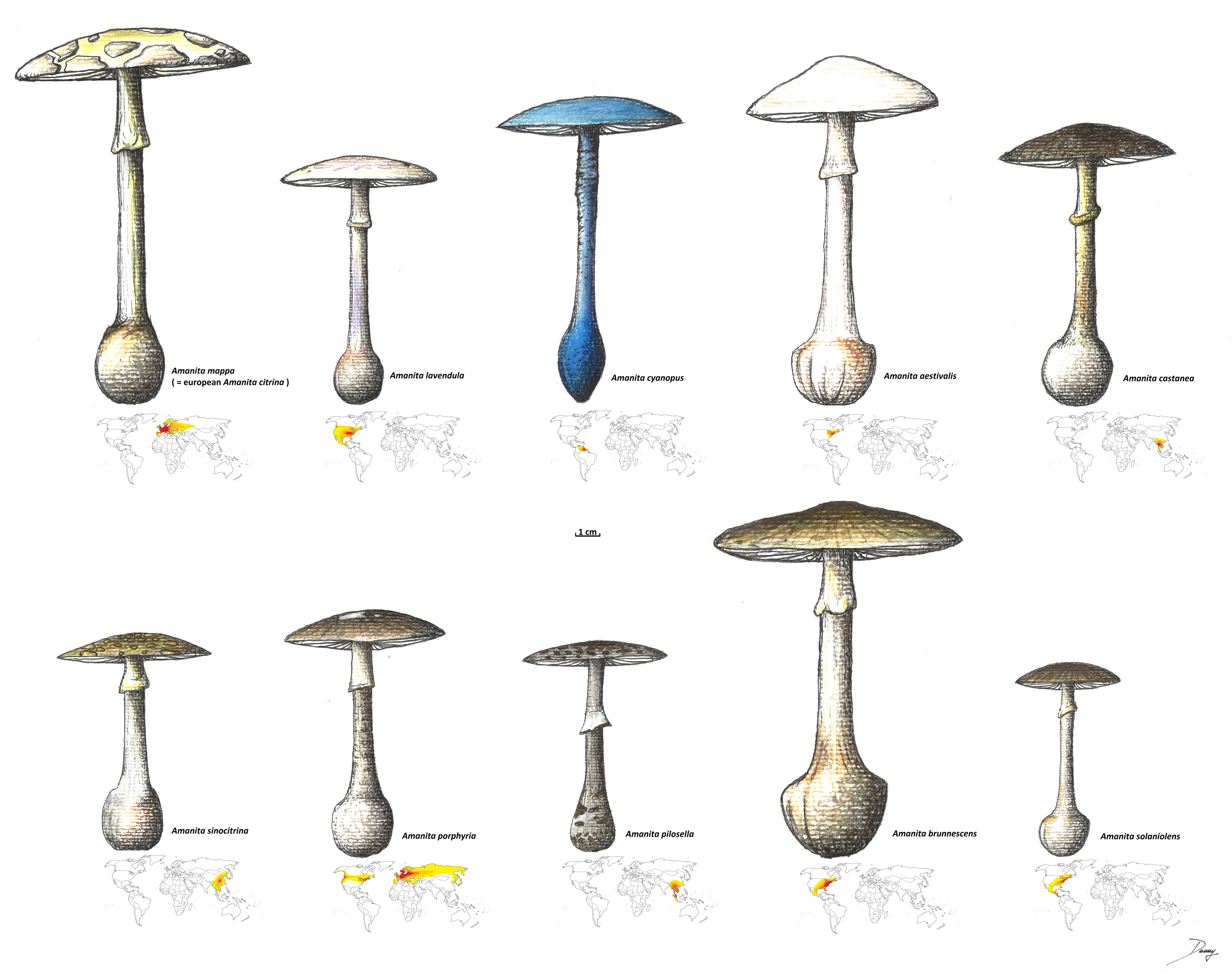

This mushroom has a fleshy pale yellow, or sometimes white, cap from 4–10 centimetres (1 1/2–4 inches) across, covered in irregular patches. The gills and flesh are white. There is a large volva at the base of the 6–8 cm (2 1/2–3 in) tall stem, which has a clear ring.

The mushroom has a smell of rapeseed or potato.

=== Similar species ===
It is often confused with the related Amanita phalloides, the death cap, hence the common name.

== Distribution and ecology ==
The false death cap is found in deciduous and coniferous woodlands in autumn in Europe. It also occurs in North America, South Africa, Australia, Russia, Costa Rica, the UK, and in parts of Asia.

This mushroom has been recorded as a secondary food source for adults of the pleasing fungus beetle Tritoma biguttata biguttata.

== Toxicity ==
Research done at the University of Cambridge indicated that this mushroom contains the alpha-amanitin toxin, but possibly in small enough amounts that would not cause adverse effects unless ingested at high quantity. It also contains the toxin bufotenin. Although it is considered inedible, the biggest danger with this species is its marked similarity to the death cap. For further more information about DMT found in Amanita citrina see external link about the study made.

== Gallery ==
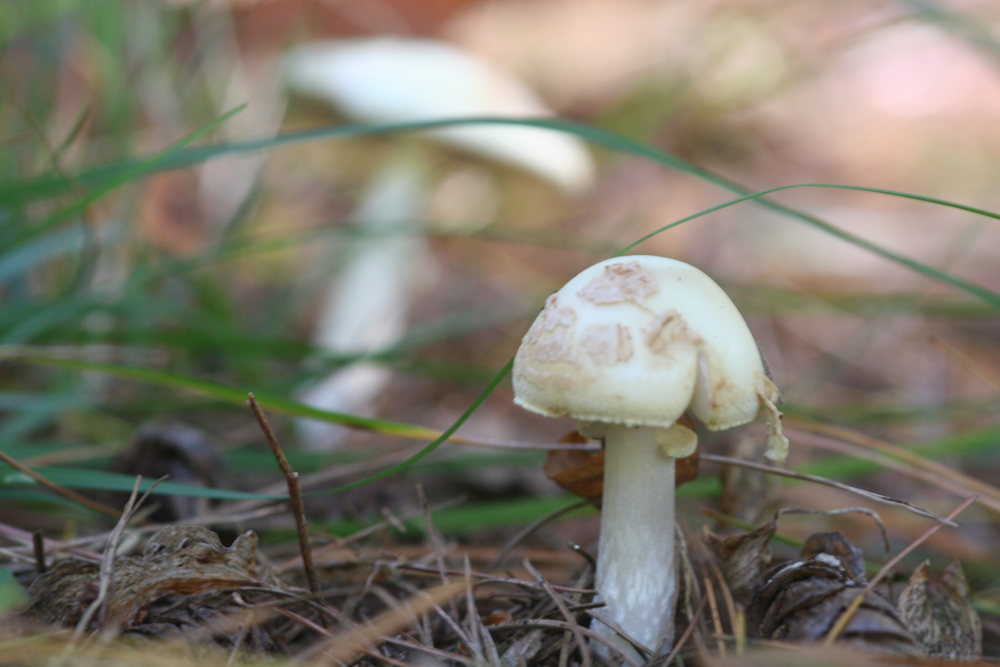
A closer view of an emergent specimen

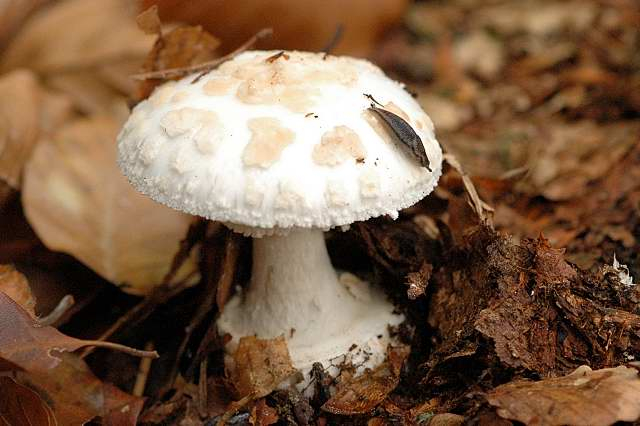
A. citrina from Commanster, Belgium

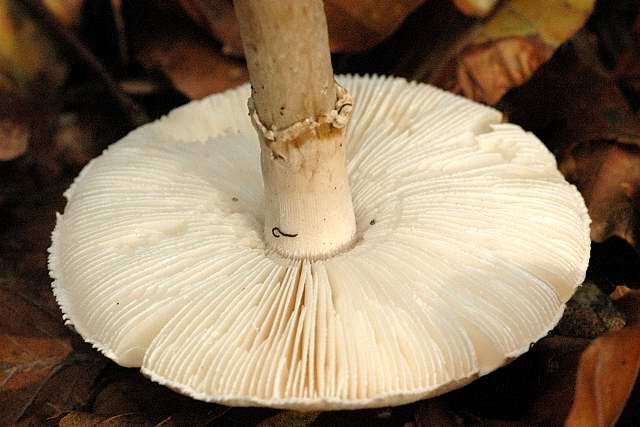
Closer view of gills and ring of a specimen from Commanster, Belgium

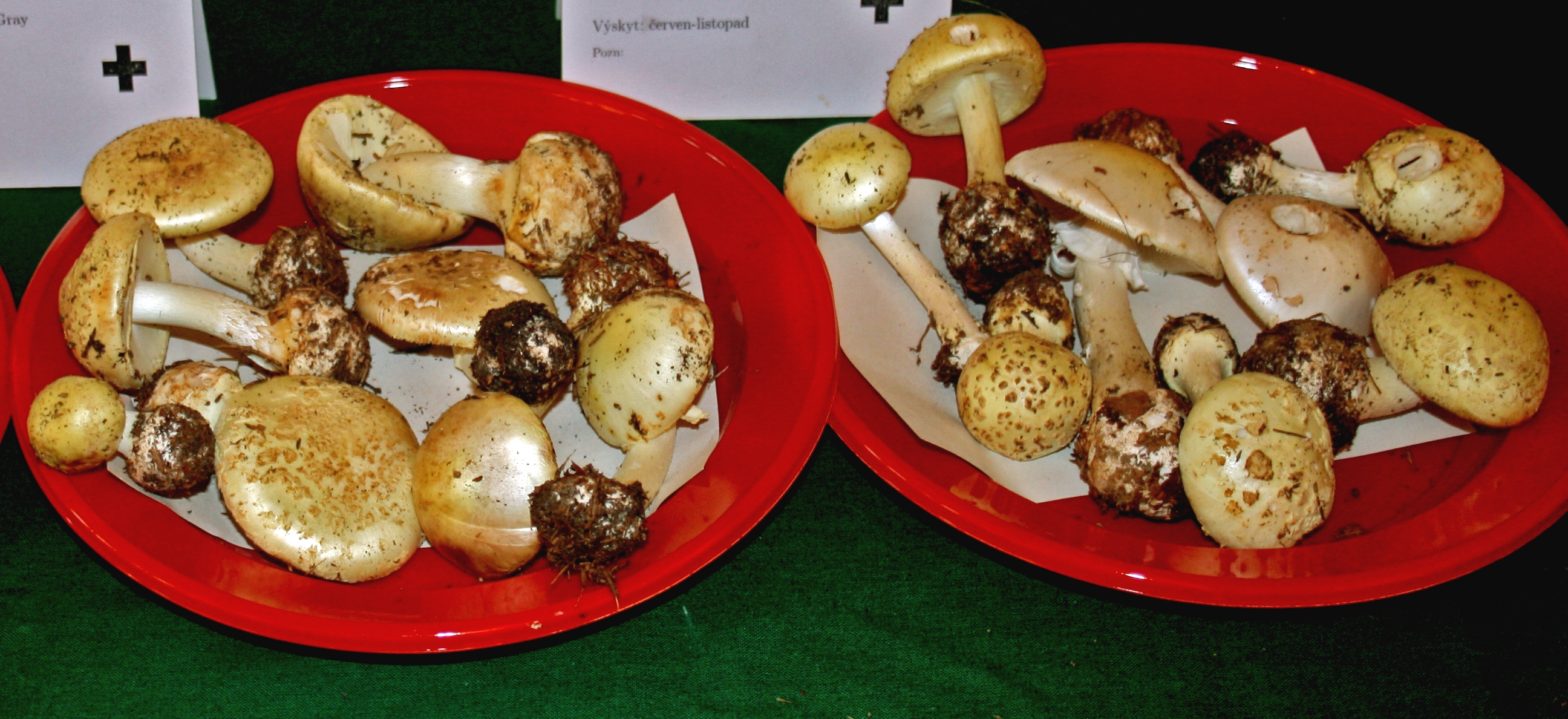
A. citrina at the 12-th countrywide mushroom exhibition 2008, Žofín, Prague, Czech Republic

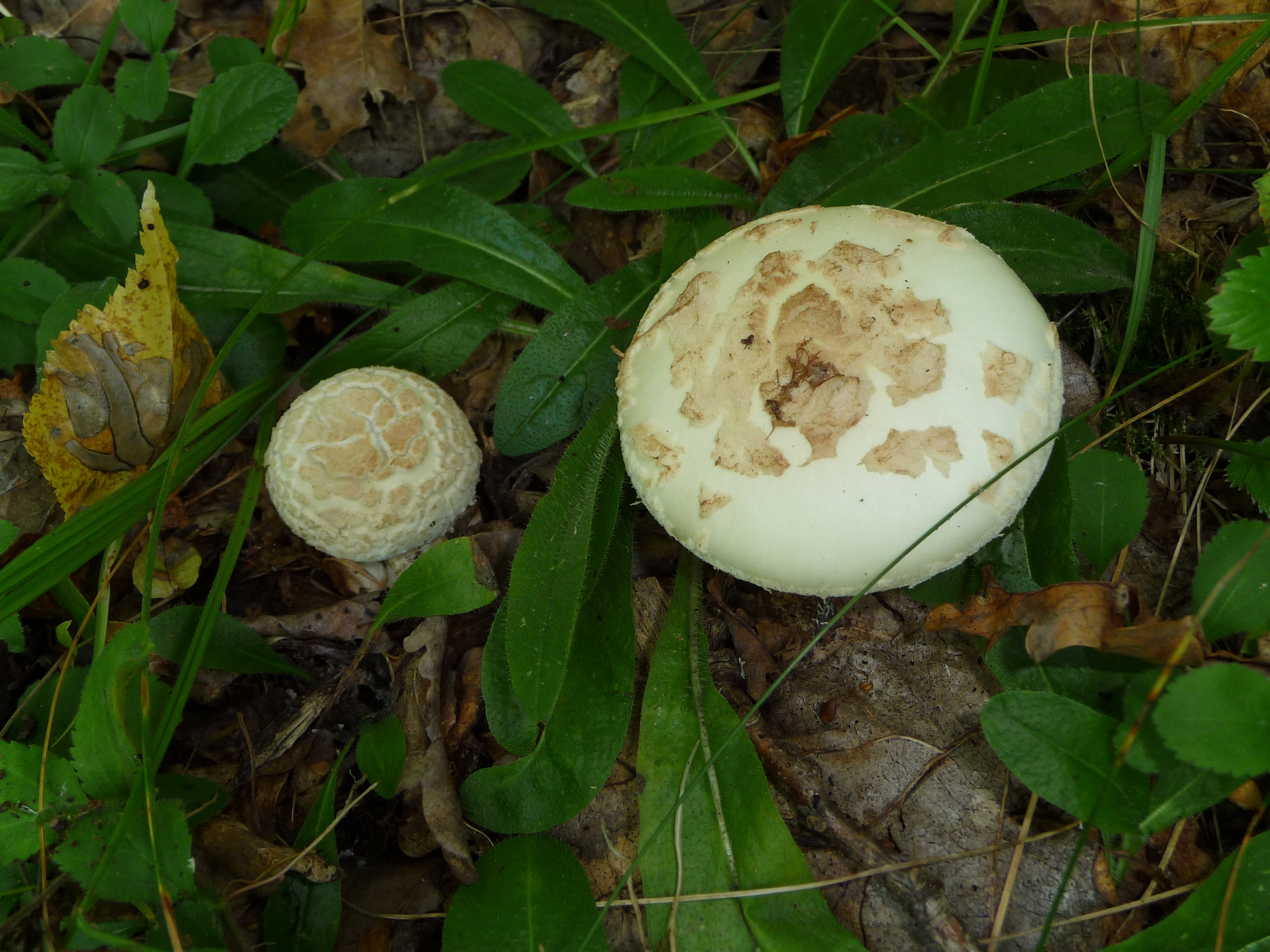
A. citrina in Ukraine (Co-ordinates:49°19′20.03″N 28°33′29.20″E)

== See also ==
- List of Amanita species
