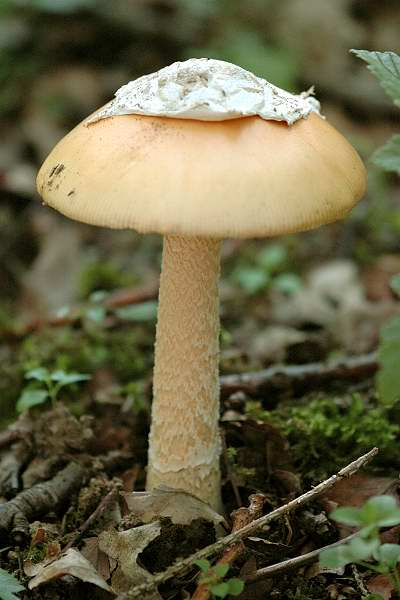

Scientific classification
- Kingdom: Fungi
- Division: Basidiomycota
- Class: Agaricomycetes
- Order: Agaricales
- Family: Amanitaceae
- Genus: Amanita
- Species: A. crocea

Binomial name
- Amanita crocea (Quél. in Bourd.) Singer ex Singer

Synonyms
- Orange Grisette; Amanita vaginata var. crocea Quél. 1898 [LEG; MB456911]; Amanitopsis crocea (Quél.) E.-J. Gilbert 1928 [LEG; MB251657]

= Amanita crocea =

Saffron ringless amanita

Species of fungus

Amanita crocea
- Mycological characteristics
- Gills on hymenium
- Cap is flat or convex
- Hymenium is free
- Stipe has a volva
- Spore print is white
- Ecology is mycorrhizal
- Edibility is edible but not recommended

Amanita crocea, the saffron ringless amanita, is a species of Amanita widely distributed in Europe. It is edible but not recommended for consumption due to its similarity to poisonous species of the genus.

== Description ==
The cap is free of rings with the volva and has a diameter of 5–10 centimetres (2–4 inches), yellow-orange in colour with an apricot tinge at the centre. It expands to become flat or sometimes convex at the umbo, a small raised central area. The volva is thick, white, at least 4–10 cm (1 1/2–4 in) wide, saffron orange or a little browner than that in colour in the centre when fresh and paler at the margin.

The gills are free and cream in mass (sometimes with a slight salmon or pinkish reflection, and 2–3± millimetres broad).

The stem or stipe is 10–15 cm (4–6 in) long and 1–1.5 cm in diameter, tapering, decorated with paler fibrils in a "flame" pattern, with the decoration later becoming orange or brown-orange (darker than the underlying stipe surface) with a membranous sack-like volva at the base.

The white spores measure (8.0-) 9.4–11.8 (-18.8) x (7.5-) 8.5–11.0 (-16.0) μm.

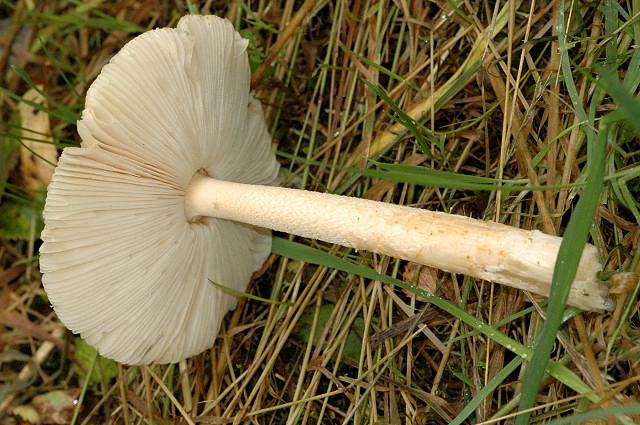
Belgian specimen

=== Similar species ===
It is similar to Amanita fulva (orange-brown ringless amanita or tawny grisette) and A. caesarea (Caesar's mushroom), belonging to the Vaginatae and Caesareae sections of the Amanita genus, respectively.

The edible tawny grisette is a basidiomycete mushroom located in North America and Europe. It is easily confused with the 'death cap', though is not as substantial. The structure is relatively flimsy and the hollow stem often breaks, even when handled very gently. It has fibres on its stalk usually.

The second similar species, the Caesar's mushroom, is the type species (a species that taxonomically defines a genus or other taxon higher than species-level) of the Caesareae section of the genus Amanita. It has a distinctive orange cap, yellow gills and stem. Similar orange-capped species occur in North America and India.

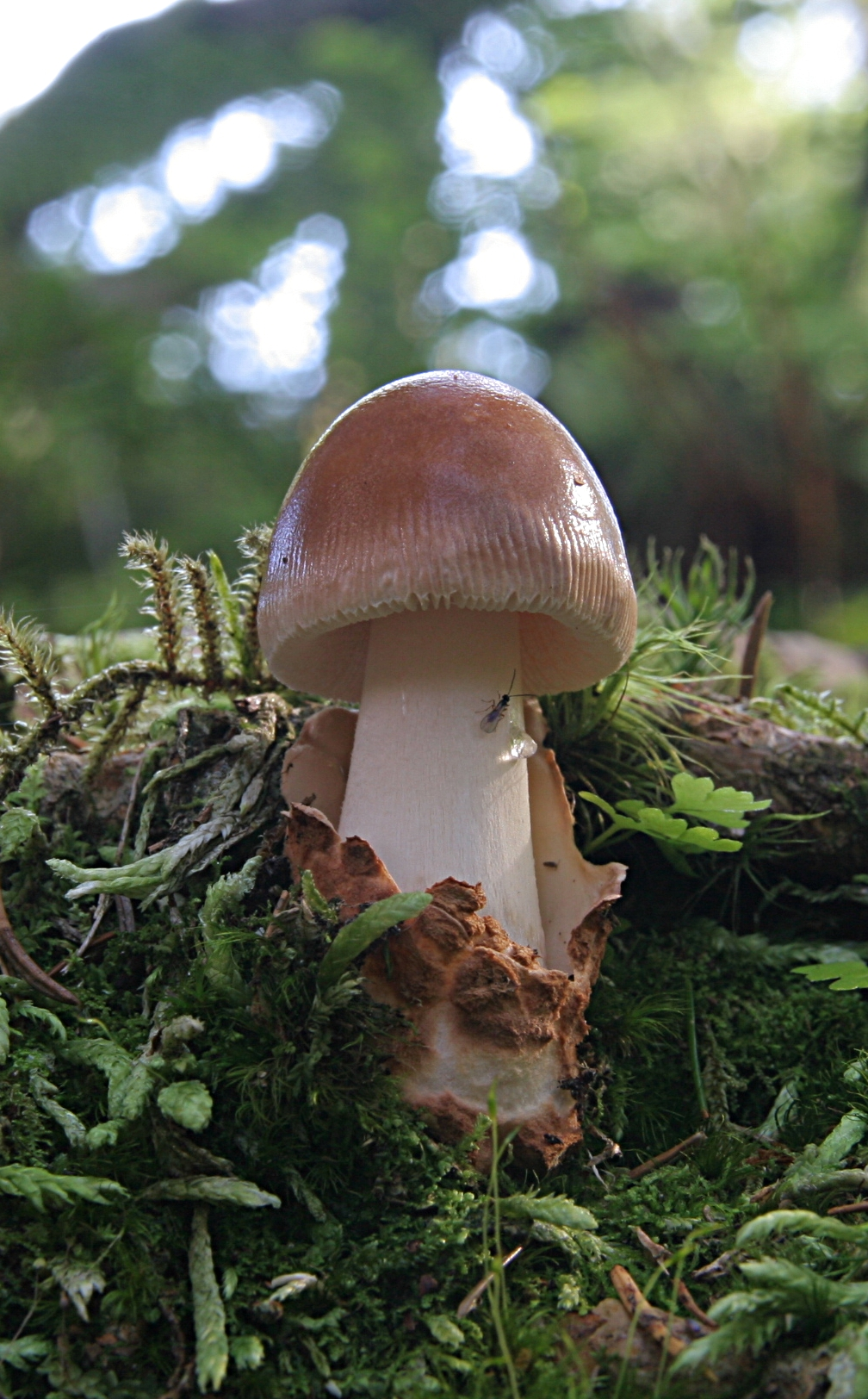
Amanita fulva in Norway

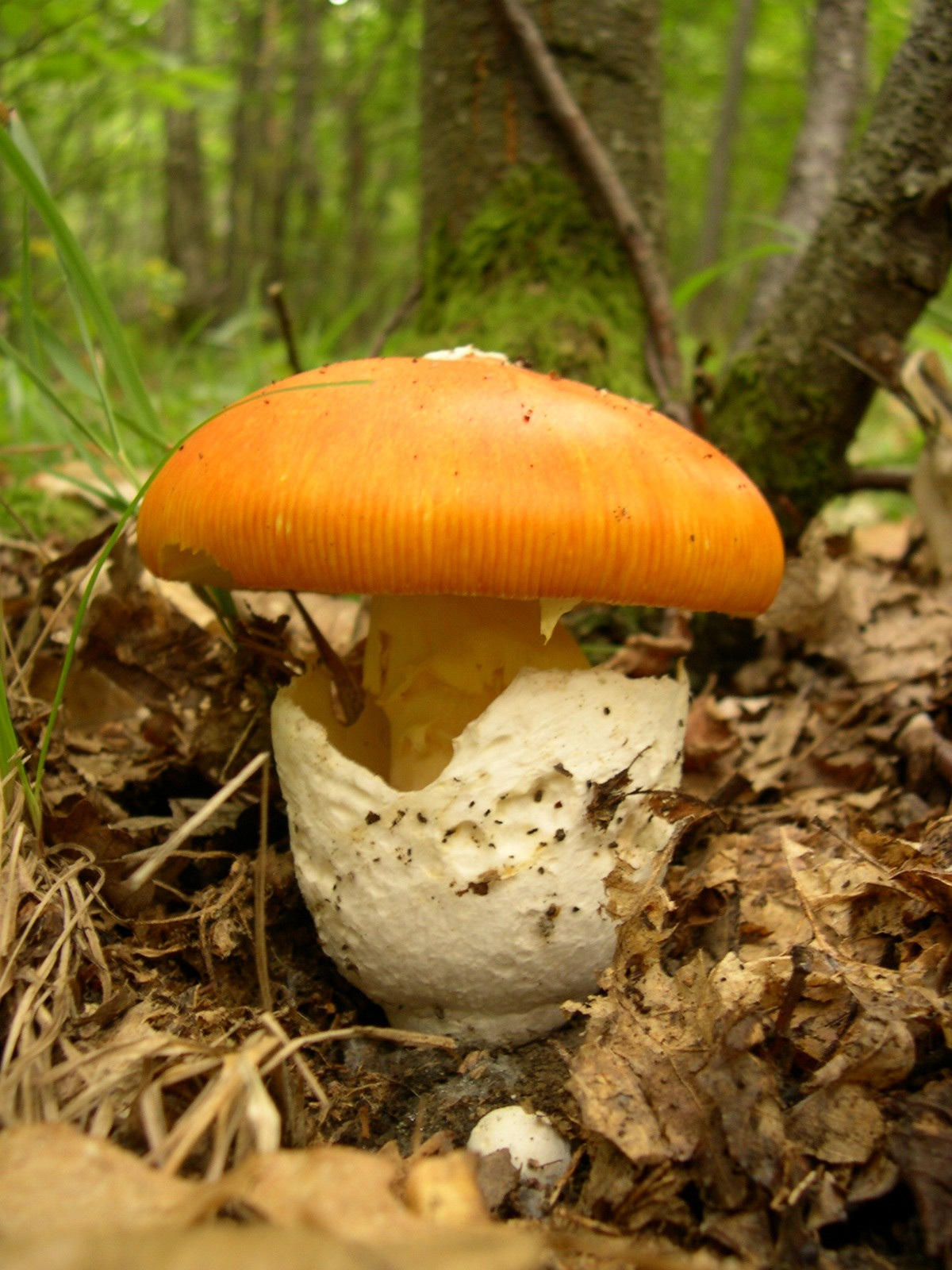
A. caesarea in Piacenza mountains

== Ecology ==
The fungi can occur infrequently between July and October in mycorrhizal with hardwood trees, particularly birch and beech in clearings. Its odour is sweet-smelling and it has a mildly nutty sweet taste. It has also been reported from Iran.

== Uses ==
While edible, guides advise not to eat it as many similar-looking Amanitas are very poisonous.

== See also ==
- List of Amanita species
