= Aptilosia =

Scientific classification
- Domain: Eukaryota
- Kingdom: Animalia
- Phylum: Arthropoda
- Class: Insecta
- Order: Lepidoptera
- Superfamily: Noctuoidea
- Family: Erebidae
- Subfamily: Arctiinae
- Tribe: Lithosiini
- Genus: Aptilosia; Schaus, 1911
- Species: A. crocea

Binomial name
- Aptilosia crocea Schaus, 1911

Genus of moths

Aptilosia is a monotypic moth genus in the subfamily Arctiinae. Its only species, Aptilosia crocea, is found in Costa Rica and Panama. Both the genus and species were first described by William Schaus in 1911.
