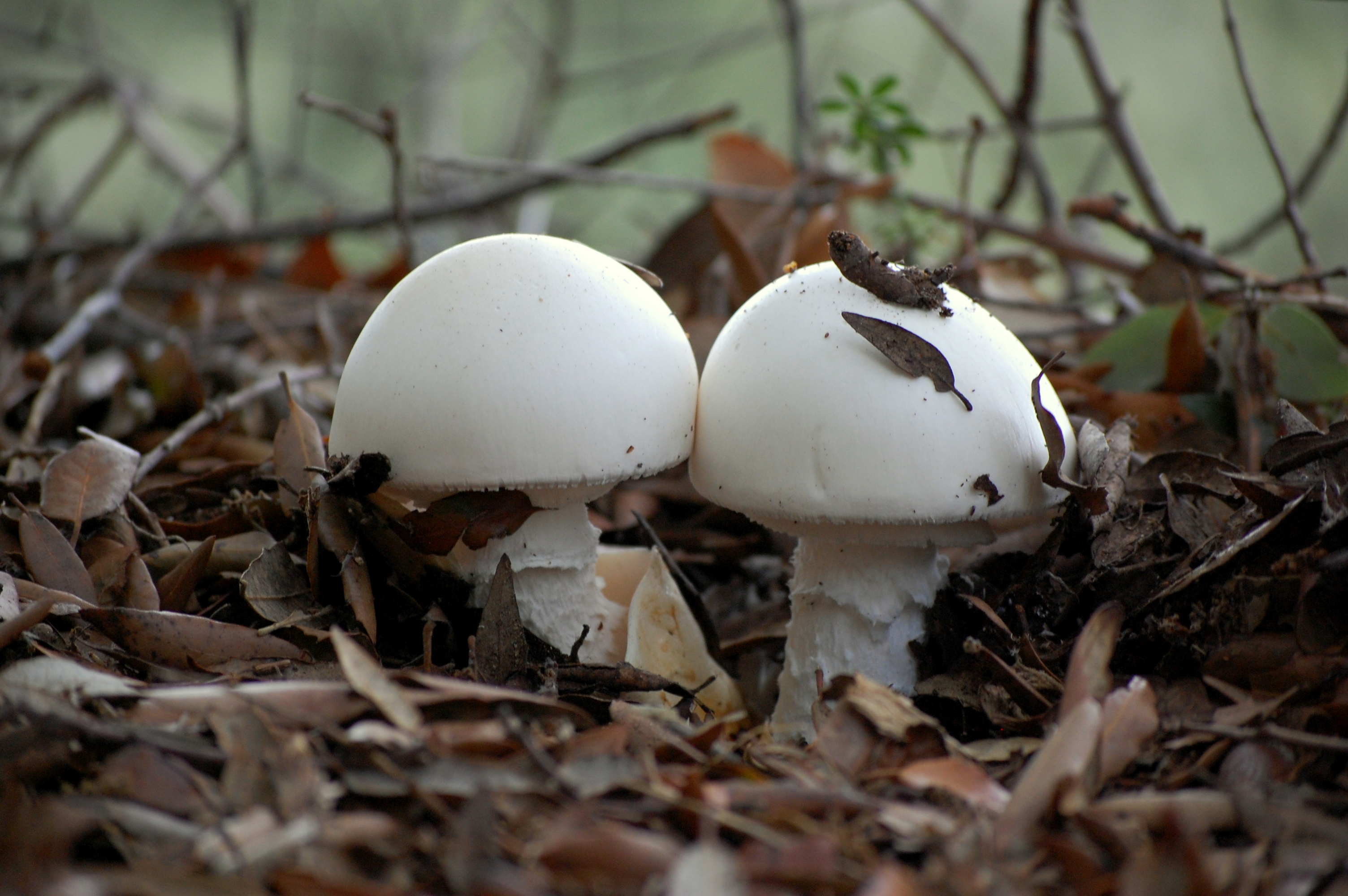

Scientific classification
- Kingdom: Fungi
- Division: Basidiomycota
- Class: Agaricomycetes
- Order: Agaricales
- Family: Amanitaceae
- Genus: Amanita
- Species: A. proxima

Binomial name
- Amanita proxima Dumée 1916

= Amanita proxima =

Species of fungus

Amanita proxima
- Mycological characteristics
- Gills on hymenium
- Cap is convex or flat
- Hymenium is free
- Stipe has a ring and volva
- Spore print is white
- Ecology is mycorrhizal
- Edibility is poisonous

Amanita proxima is a species of Amanita from France, Italy, and Spain. It is poisonous.
