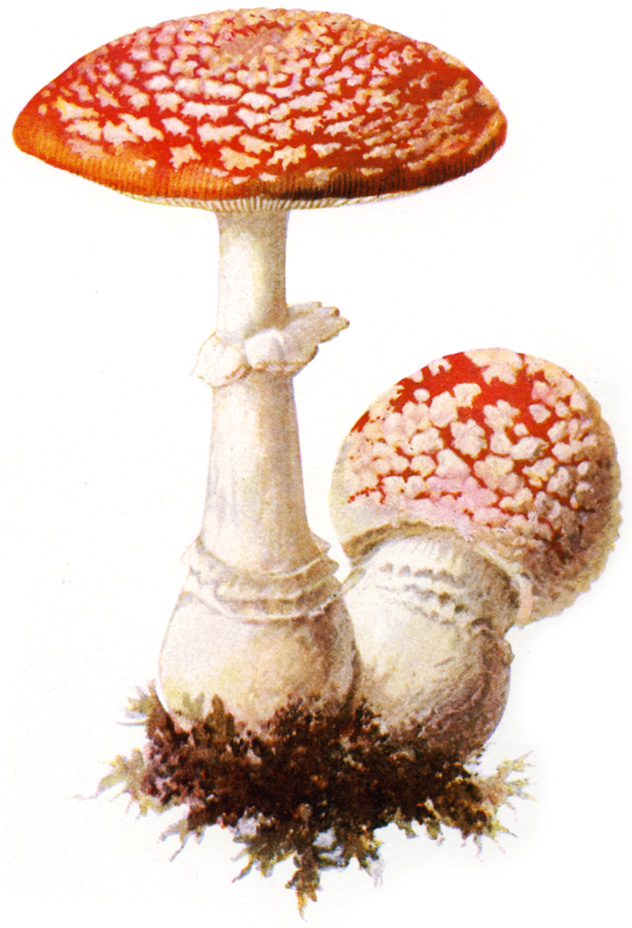
- Amanita muscaria Albin Schmalfuß, 1869

Scientific classification
- Kingdom: Fungi
- Division: Basidiomycota
- Class: Agaricomycetes
- Order: Agaricales
- Family: Amanitaceae
- Genus: Amanita; Pers. (1794)

Type species
- Amanita muscaria (L.) Lam. (1783)

Diversity
- c. 600 species

Synonyms
- Amanitopsis Roze; Amarrendia Bougher & T. Lebel; Torrendia Bres.

= Amanita =

Genus of mushrooms

Amanita
- Mycological characteristics
- Gills on hymenium
- Cap is convex or flat
- Hymenium is free
- Stipe has a ring and volva
- Spore print is white
- Ecology is mycorrhizal
- Edibility is poisonous or psychoactive

The genus Amanita contains about 600 described species of agarics, including some of the most toxic known mushrooms found worldwide, as well as some well-regarded edible species (and many species of unproven edibility). The genus is responsible for 95% of fatalities resulting from mushroom poisoning, with the death cap accounting for 90% of fatalities every year. The most potent toxin synthesized by this genus is α-Amanitin.

The genus also contains many edible mushrooms, but mycologists advice caution in selecting any of these for human consumption, due to the potentially lethal consequences of misidentification. Nonetheless, in some cultures, the larger local edible species of Amanita are mainstays of the markets in the local growing season. Samples of this are Amanita zambiana and other fleshy species in central Africa, A. basii and similar species in Mexico, A. caesarea and the "Blusher" A. rubescens in Europe, and A. chepangiana in Southeast Asia. Other species are used for colouring sauces, such as the red A. jacksonii, with a range from eastern Canada to eastern Mexico.

North American members of this genus have been recorded as main food of the pleasing fungus beetle Tritoma biguttata. Unspecified Amanita were also found associated with the related T. atriventris, but it does not seem to be a regular food source for that beetle species.

== Taxonomy ==
The genus Amanita was first published with its current meaning by Christian Hendrik Persoon in 1797. Under the International Code of Botanical Nomenclature, Persoon's concept of Amanita, with Amanita muscaria (L.) Pers. as the type species, has been officially conserved against the older Amanita Boehm (1760), which is considered a synonym of Agaricus L.

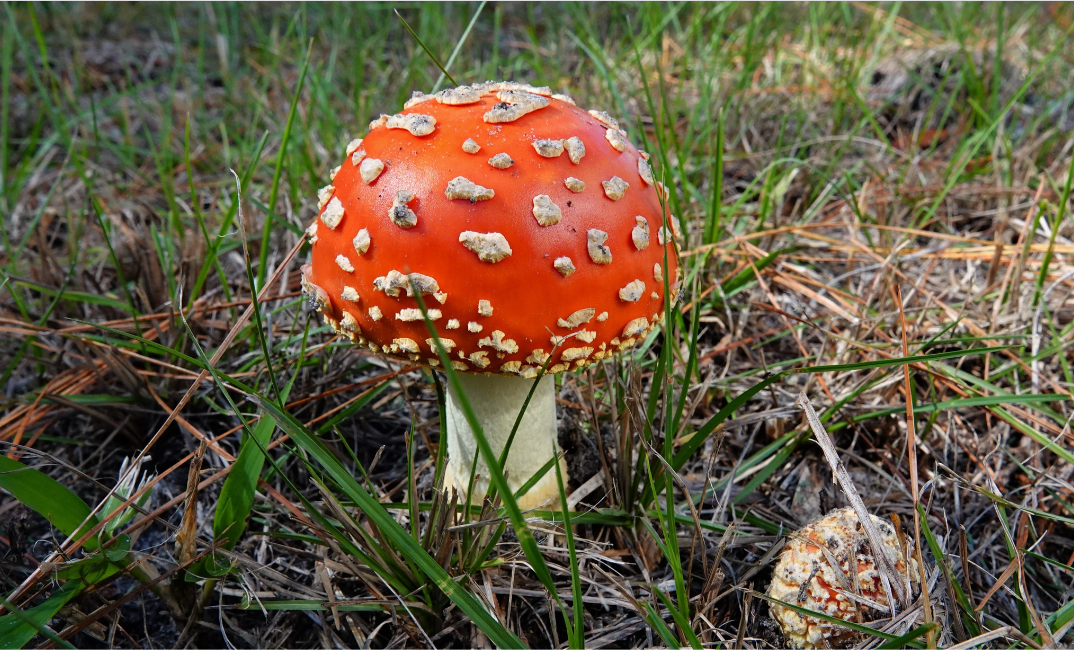
The very recognizable fly agaric

=== Etymology ===
The name is possibly derived from Amanus (Ancient Greek: Ἁμανός), a mountain in Cilicia, or from Amantia, an ancient city in the transboundary region between Epirus or southern Illyria in antiquity.

== Toxicity ==
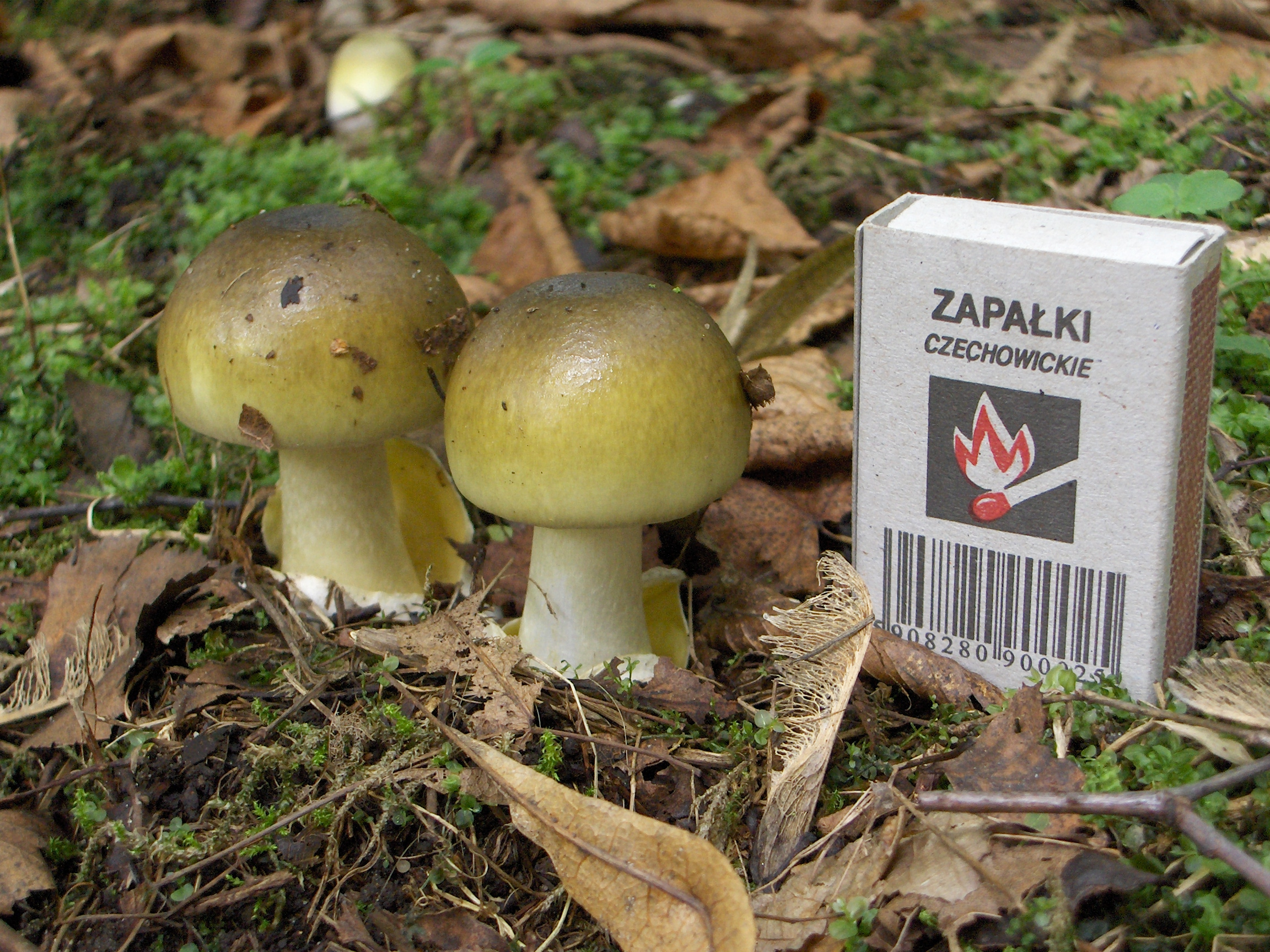
A. phalloides, the death cap

Several members of the section Phalloideae are notable for their toxicity, containing toxins known as amatoxins, which can cause liver failure and death. These include the death cap A. phalloides; species known as destroying angels, including A. virosa, A. bisporigera and A. ocreata; and the fool's mushroom, A. verna.

More recently, a series in the subgenus Lepidella has been found to cause acute kidney failure, including A. smithiana of northwestern North America, A. pseudoporphyria of Japan, and A. proxima of southern Europe.

== Edibility ==
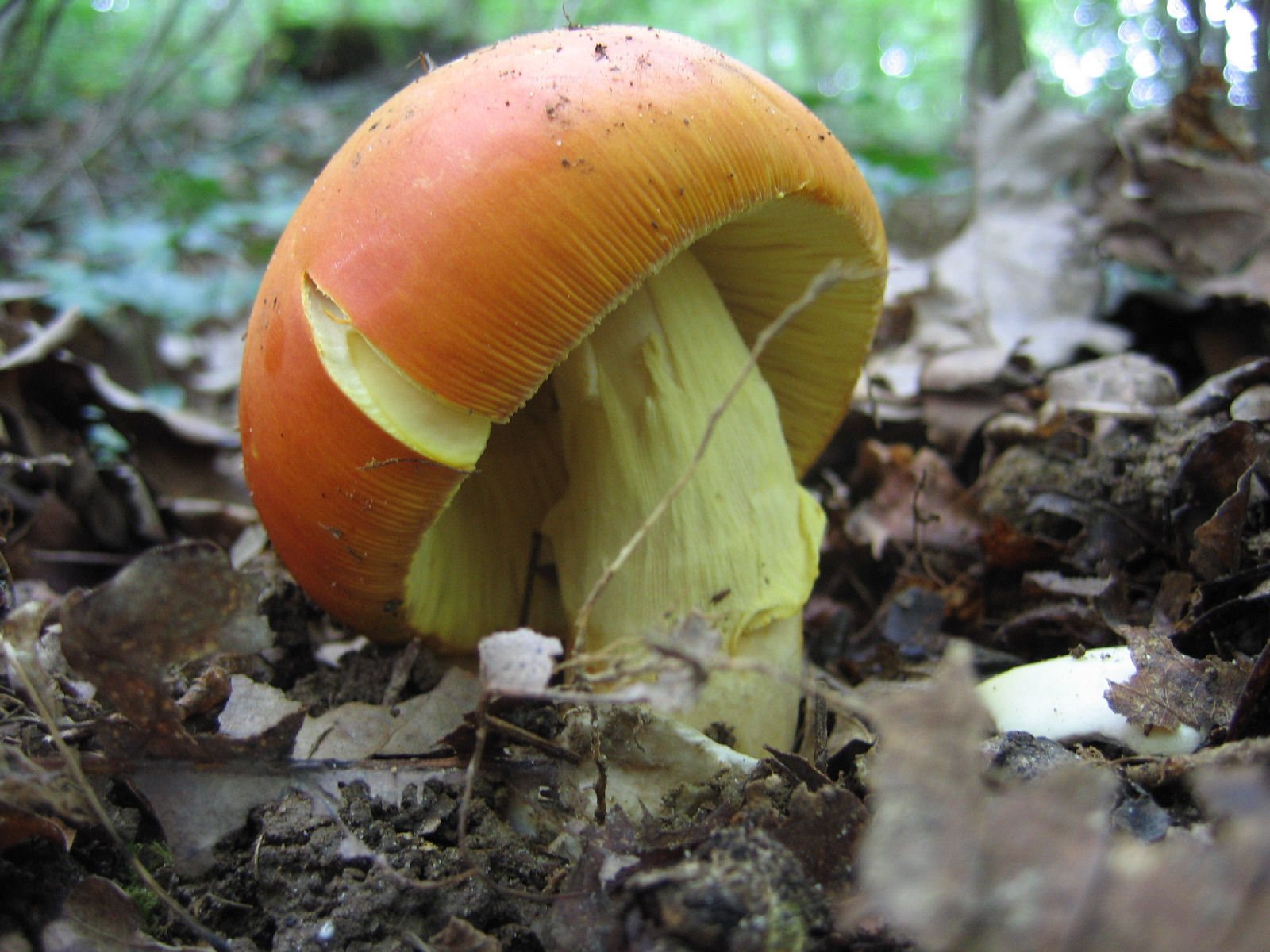
A. caesarea (edible)

Many species of Amanita are edible, including all of sect. Caesareae and sect. Vaginatae (together comprising hundreds of species). Many fungi experts strongly advise against eating mushrooms unless the species is known with absolute certainty. Many species within this genus are toxic, with some species being lethal, so misidentification may lead to sickness or death.

=== Edible ===
Edible species of Amanita include Amanita fulva, A. vaginata (grisette), A. calyptrata (coccoli), A. crocea, A. rubescens (blusher), A. caesarea (Caesar's mushroom), and A. jacksonii (American Caesar's mushroom).

=== Inedible ===
Inedible species of Amanita include Amanita albocreata (ringless panther), A. atkinsoniana, A. citrina (false death cap), A. excelsa, A. flavorubescens, A. franchetii, A. longipes, A. onusta, A. rhopalopus, A. silvicola, A. sinicoflava, A. spreta, and A. volvata.

=== Poisonous ===
Poisonous species include Amanita brunnescens, A. cokeri (Coker's amanita), A. crenulata, A. farinosa (eastern American floury amanita), A. frostiana, A. muscaria (fly agaric), A. pantherina (panther cap), and A. porphyria, but not A. ceciliae.

=== Deadly poisonous ===
Deadly poisonous species include Amanita abrupta, A. arocheae, A. bisporigera (eastern NA destroying angel), A. exitialis (Guangzhou destroying angel), A. magnivelaris, A. ocreata (western NA destroying angel), A. phalloides (death cap), A. proxima, A. smithiana, A. subjunquillea (East Asian death cap), A. verna (fool's mushroom), and A. virosa (European destroying angel).

== Psychoactive species ==
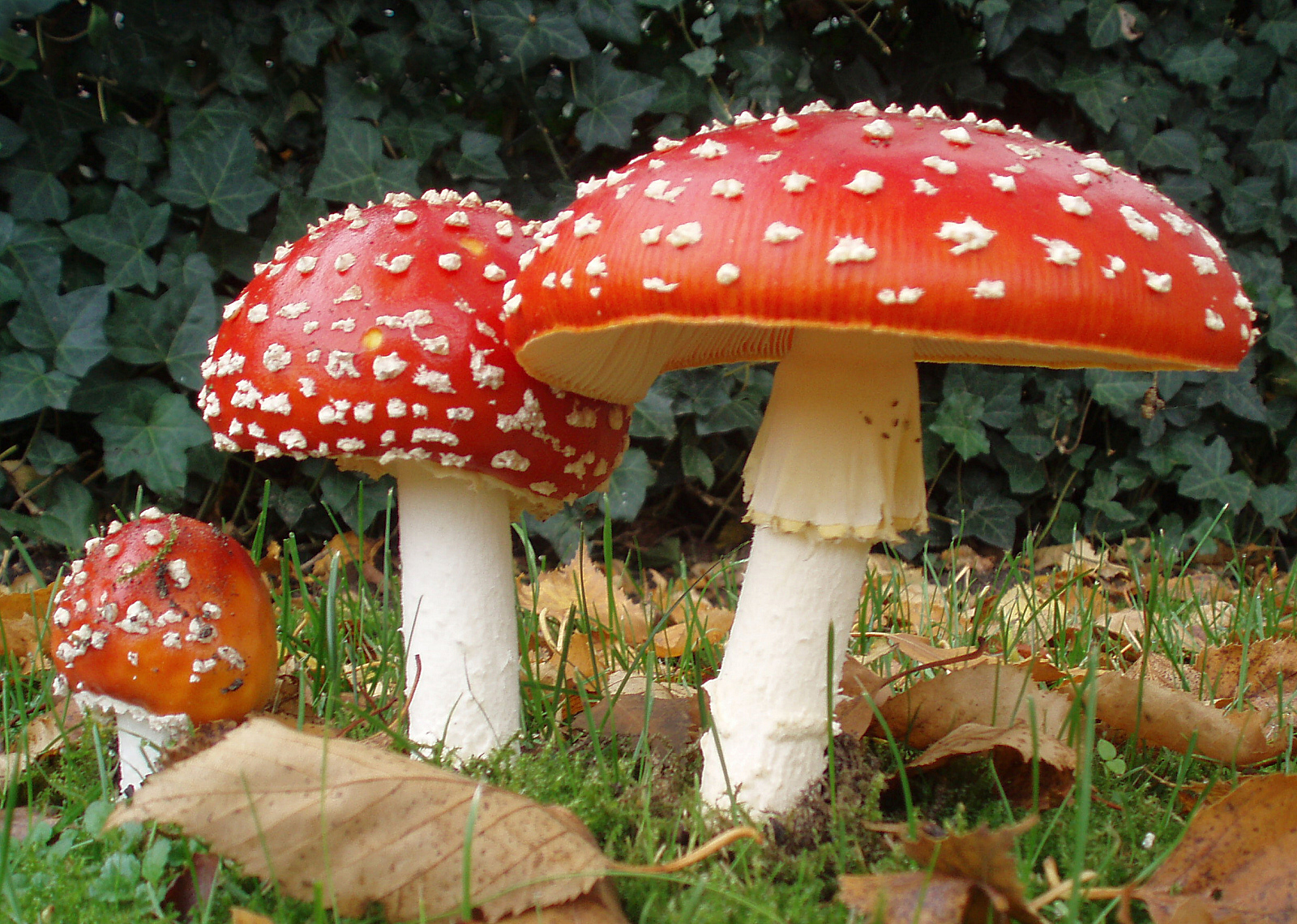
Amanita muscaria, commonly known as the fly agaric, contains the psychoactive compound ibotenic acid.

=== Amanita muscaria ===
Amanita muscaria was widely used as an entheogen by many of the indigenous peoples of Siberia. Its use was known among almost all of the Uralic-speaking peoples of western Siberia and the Paleosiberian-speaking peoples of the Russian Far East. There are only isolated reports of A. muscaria use among the Tungusic and Turkic peoples of central Siberia and it is believed that on the whole entheogenic use of A. muscaria was not practiced by these peoples.

=== Amanita pantherina ===
Muscimol (also known as pantherine) is an isoxazole. Pantherine is named after Amanita pantherina.

Amanita pantherina contains the psychoactive compound muscimol, but has been used as an entheogen far less often than A. muscaria.

=== Others ===
Other species identified as containing psychoactive substances include:

- Amanita citrina
- Amanita gemmata
- Amanita porphyria
- Amanita persicina
- Amanita regalis
- Amanita strobiliformis

== See also ==
- List of Amanita species
