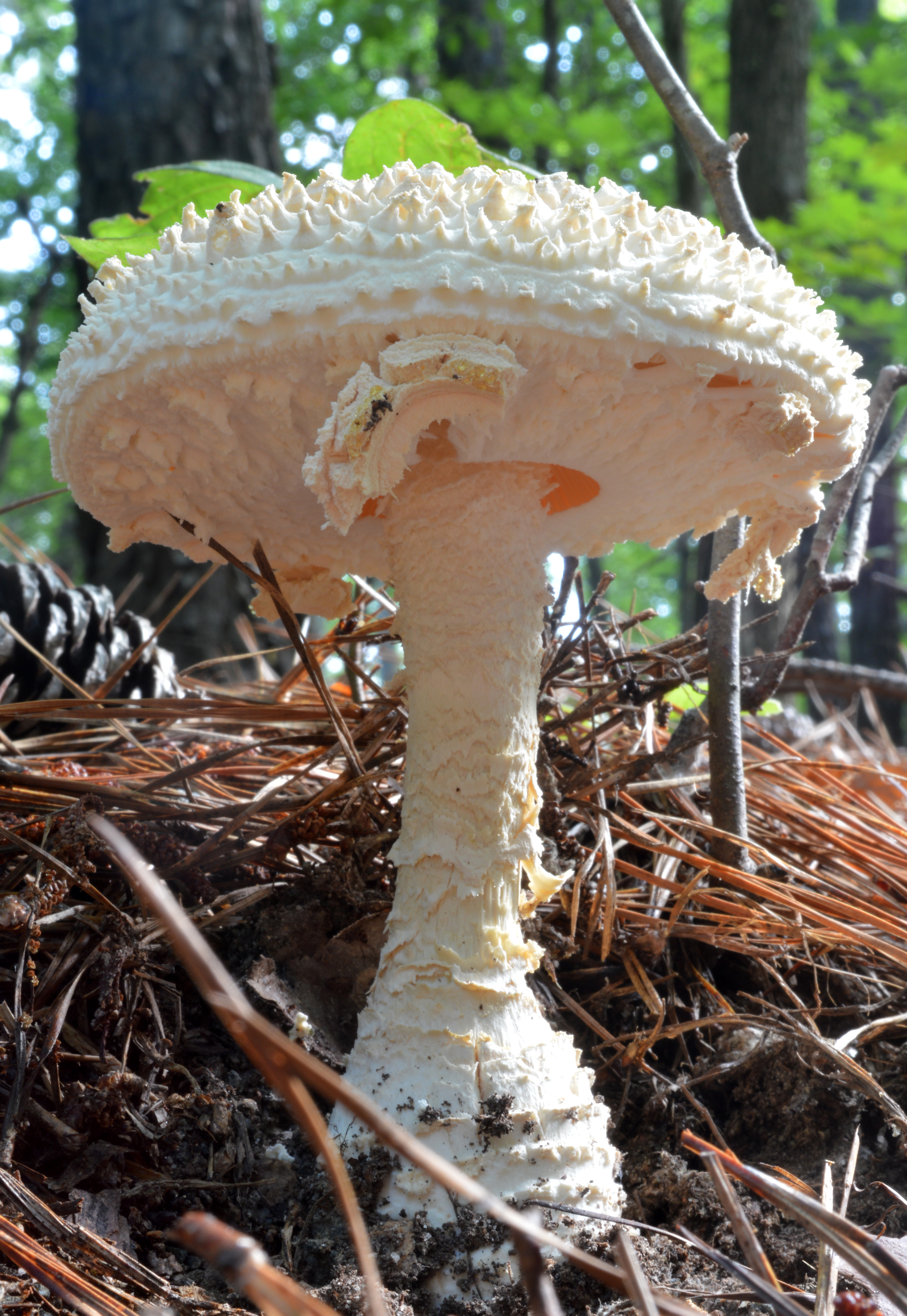

Scientific classification
- Kingdom: Fungi
- Division: Basidiomycota
- Class: Agaricomycetes
- Order: Agaricales
- Family: Amanitaceae
- Genus: Amanita
- Species: A. ravenelii

Binomial name
- Amanita ravenelii (Berk. & Broome) Sacc. (1887)

Synonyms
- Agaricus ravenelii Berk. & Broome (1887)

= Amanita ravenelii =

Species of fungus

Amanita ravenelii
- Mycological characteristics
- Gills on hymenium
- Cap is umbonate or flat
- Hymenium is free
- Stipe has a ring and volva
- Spore print is white
- Ecology is mycorrhizal
- Edibility is unknown

Amanita ravenelii, commonly known as the pinecone lepidella, is a species of fungus in the family Amanitaceae. The whitish fruit bodies (mushrooms) are medium to large, with caps up to 17 centimeters (6 1/2 inches) wide, and stems up to 25 cm (10 in) long. The cap surface has large warts and the stem has a scaly, bulbous base. The flesh of the mushrooms is firm, with a distinct chlorine-like odor.

It is widely distributed in mixed and deciduous forests of the southeastern United States, where it grows solitarily or in groups on the ground in late summer and autumn. It has also been recorded in Mexico and Argentina. It is a mycorrhizal species, although the plant species with which it tends to associate are not known. Lookalike North American Amanita species include A. chlorinosma, A. polypyramis, A. mutabilis, and A. armillariiformis. Within the genus Amanita, it is part of the section Lepidella. Guidebooks do not recommend mushrooms of this section as edible; they may be poisonous.

== Taxonomy ==
The species was first described scientifically in 1859 by Miles Joseph Berkeley and Christopher Edmund Broome as Agaricus ravenelii. The specific epithet honors Henry William Ravenel, who collected the type specimen from South Carolina. Berkeley and Broome called it "a very fine species", and compared it to Amanita strobiliformis. Pier Andrea Saccardo transferred the taxon to the genus Amanita in 1887.

It is in the subsection Solitariae, section Lepidella in the genus Amanita. Other North American species in the section Lepidella include A. abrupta, A. atkinsoniana, A. chlorinosma, A. cokeri, A. daucipes, A. mutabilis, A. onusta, A. pelioma, A. polypyramis, and A. rhopalopus.

The fungus is commonly known as the "pinecone lepidella".

== Description ==
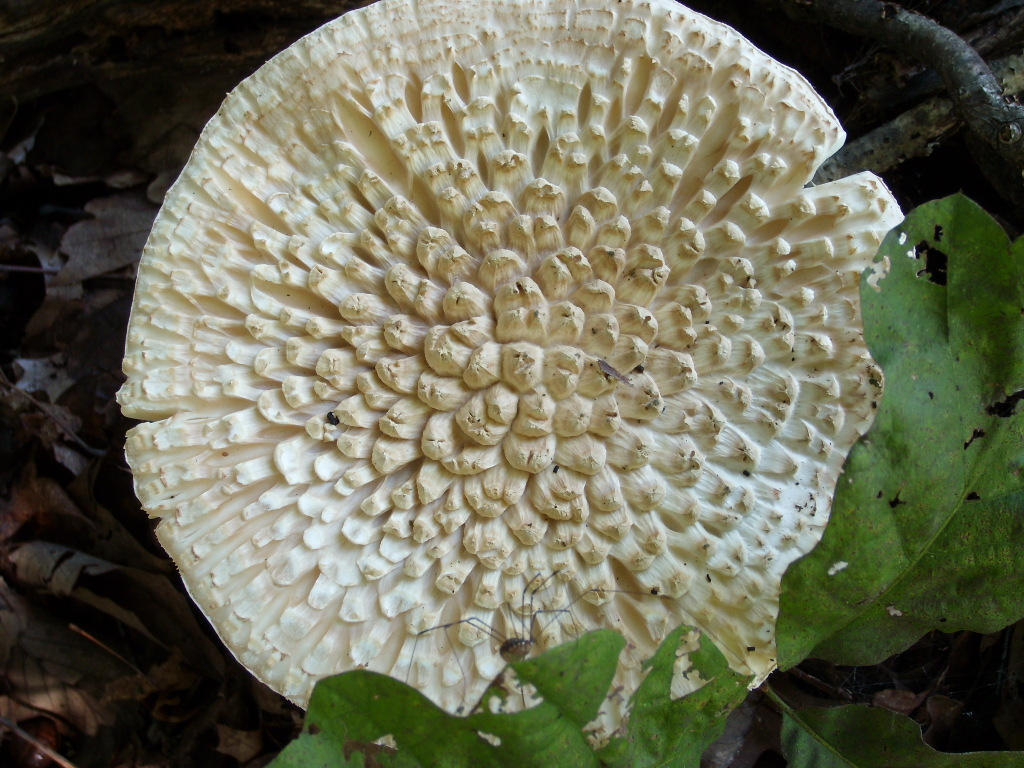
The cap surface is covered with conical to truncate-conical warts.

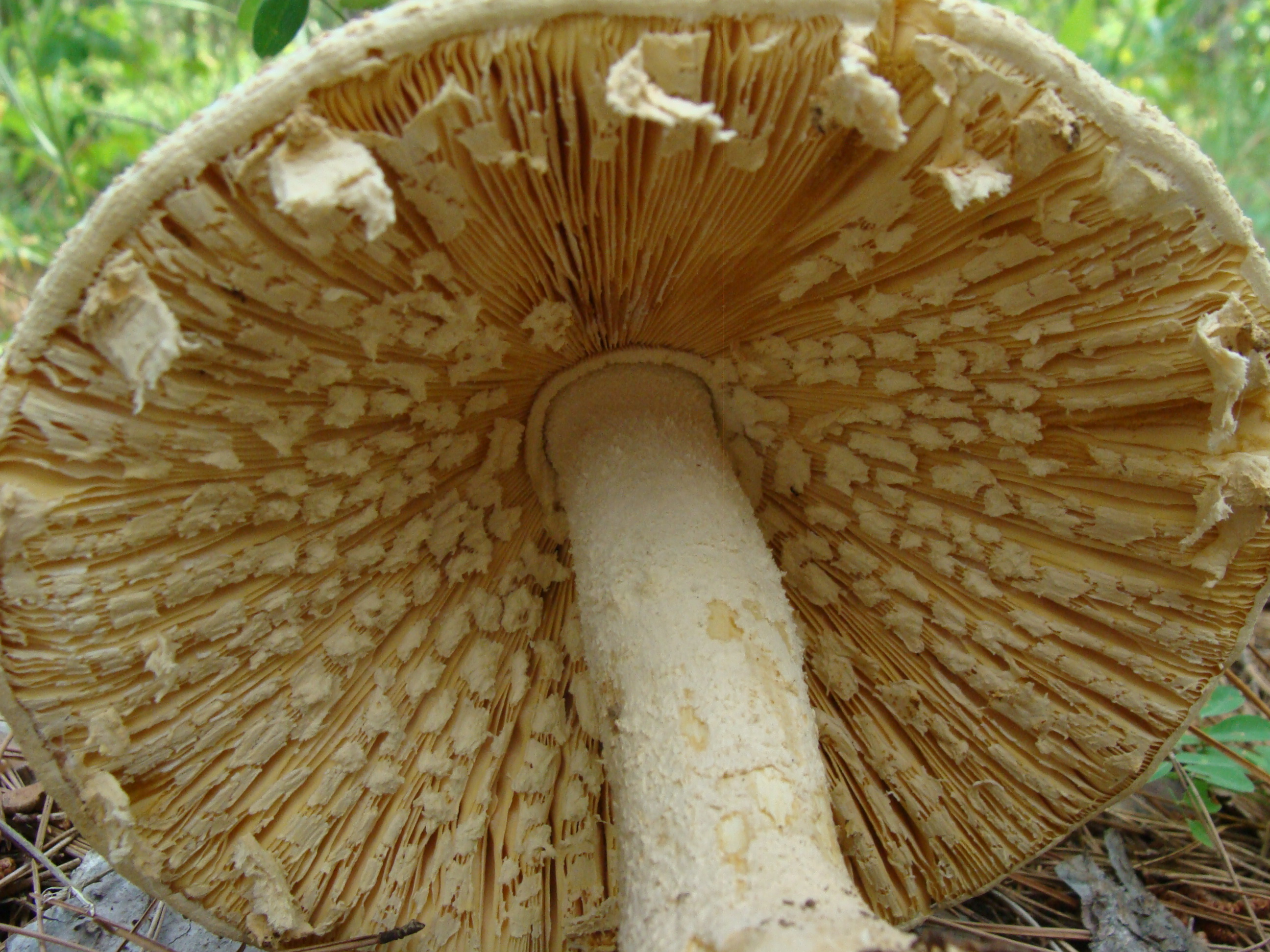
The gills here are covered with remnants of the partial veil.

The cap is 8–17 centimeters (3–6 1/2 inches) wide, initially hemispherical to almost round, later becoming convex to flattened. It is fleshy, white to yellowish-white, usually dry, but occasionally slightly sticky with age. The universal veil remains as a pale yellow to brownish-orange layer that breaks up into crowded, rather coarse, conical to truncate-conical warts. The warts are up to 6 millimetres (1/4 in) wide and 4 mm (1/8 in) high, becoming more scale-like towards the cap margin with age. The margin is non-striate (without any grooves), and appendiculate (with partial veil remnants hanging along the cap margin).

The gills are free from attachment to the stem, crowded together, moderately broad, and yellowish-white to pale yellow. Interspersed among the gills are short gills (lamellulae) that do not extend completely to the stem; they are somewhat truncated (abruptly terminated) to attenuated (tapering gradually).

The stem is 10–25 cm (4–10 in) long and 1–3 cm (1/2–1 in) wide, and decreases slightly in thickness near the apex. It is solid (i.e., not hollow), white to pale yellow, and covered with tufts of soft woolly hairs or fibrils. It has a large basal bulb, swollen in the middle, which roots in the ground up to 5.5 cm (2 in). The partial veil is yellowish-white to pale yellow, forming a ring which is thick, woolly, delicate, and soon falls away. The universal veil remains at the stem base as thick scales, curved downward, often forming irregular rings.

The flesh is firm, and white to pale yellow. The mushroom tissue has an odor of chlorinated lime (bleaching powder), chlorine, "old tennis shoes", or "old ham".

=== Microscopic characteristics ===
The spores are ellipsoid, occasionally ovoid or obovoid, thin-walled, hyaline, amyloid, and measure 8–11 by 5.5–7.5 μm. The spore deposit is white. The basidia (spore-bearing cells) are 40–65 by 7–11.5 μm, four-spored, with clamps at their bases. Cheilocystidia (cystidia on the gill edge) are occasionally seen as small, club-shaped cells measuring 15–35 by 10–15 μm, on thin-walled hyphae that are 3–7 μm in diameter. The cap cuticle, which is not clearly differentiated from the cap tissue, consists of thin-walled, interwoven hyphae 2.5–9 μm in diameter. The tissue of the universal veil on the cap consists of more or less parallel and erect rows of roughly spherical, and ellipsoid to broadly ellipsoid cells, up to 78 by 65 μm and spindle- to club-shaped cells up to 125 by 30 μm. These latter cells are terminal or in short, terminal chains, and are borne on moderately abundant, thin-walled, branched, interwoven, sometimes nearly coralloid hyphae, 3–9.5 μm diameter with a few scattered oleiferous (oil-containing) hyphae, 5–12.5 μm diameter. The distribution of hyphae at the stem base is similar to that on the cap, but with more filamentous hyphae. Clamp connections are present.

=== Similar species ===
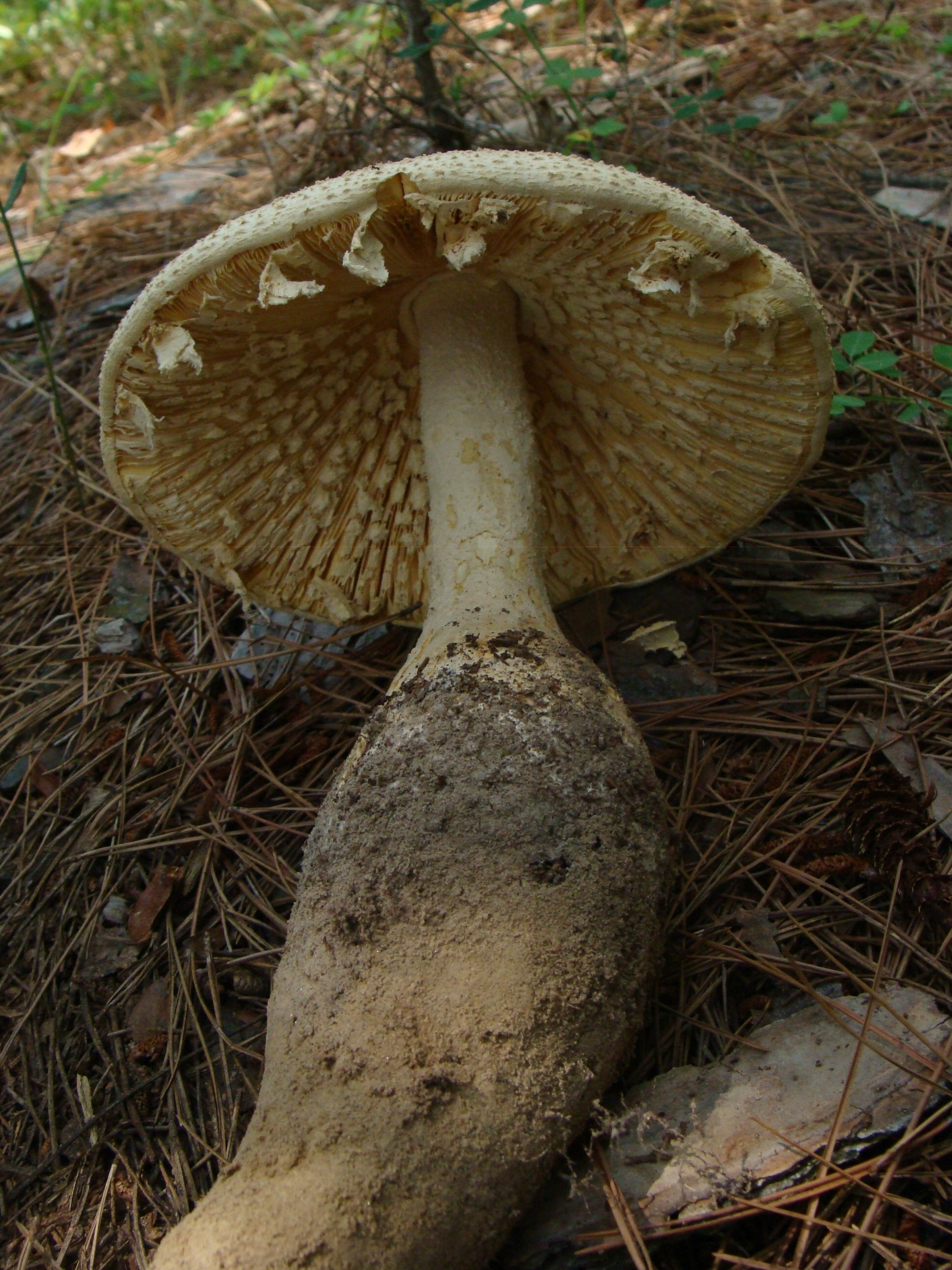
The basal bulb is characteristic of A. ravenelii.

The fruit bodies of A. ravenelii are distinguished from A. chlorinosma by the presence of pale yellow to brownish orange, large, conical to truncate-conical warts on the cap surface and a large basal bulb. The mushroom A. polypyramis is pure white, and lacks the pale yellow to brownish-orange large conical warts typical of A. ravenelii. The North American species A. armillariiformis has a similar areolate cap surface, but unlike A. ravenelii, does not have a distinct basal bulb, and it is found in semi-arid areas associated with aspen and old growth Douglas fir. Also from North America, A. mutabilis has pink tones on the cap and stem, and will turn pink when its flesh is cut; it smells of anise. Both A. daucipes and A. rhopalopus have differing warts and bulbs.

== Distribution and ecology ==
Amanita ravenelii is widely distributed in the southeastern United States, where their occurrence is "occasional to frequent" in the late summer and autumn months of August to November. Mushrooms have been collected from the US states of Maryland, North Carolina, South Carolina, Indiana, Tennessee, Virginia, and Kentucky. It has also been reported growing in northern Baja California, Mexico, and in the Argentine provinces of Tucumán, Buenos Aires, and Rio Negro.

It is a mycorrhizal fungus, meaning it forms mutualistic associations with shrubs and trees. Mushrooms grow on the ground solitarily, scattered, or in groups in mixed coniferous and deciduous forests. Although the specific tree associations preferred by A. ravenelii are unknown, in general, Amanita from section Lepidella tend to associate with diploxylon pine (that is, pines in subgenus Pinus), oak, and hickory.

Adults of the North American pleasing fungus beetle Tritoma biguttata biguttata have been recorded from a supposed "A.strobiliformis"; this is probably a misidentification of A.ravenelii, and in any case it does not seem to be a regular food source for them.

== Toxicity ==
The edibility of species in Amanita subgenus Lepidella have been described variously as unknown, not recommended, or poisonous.

== See also ==
- List of Amanita species
