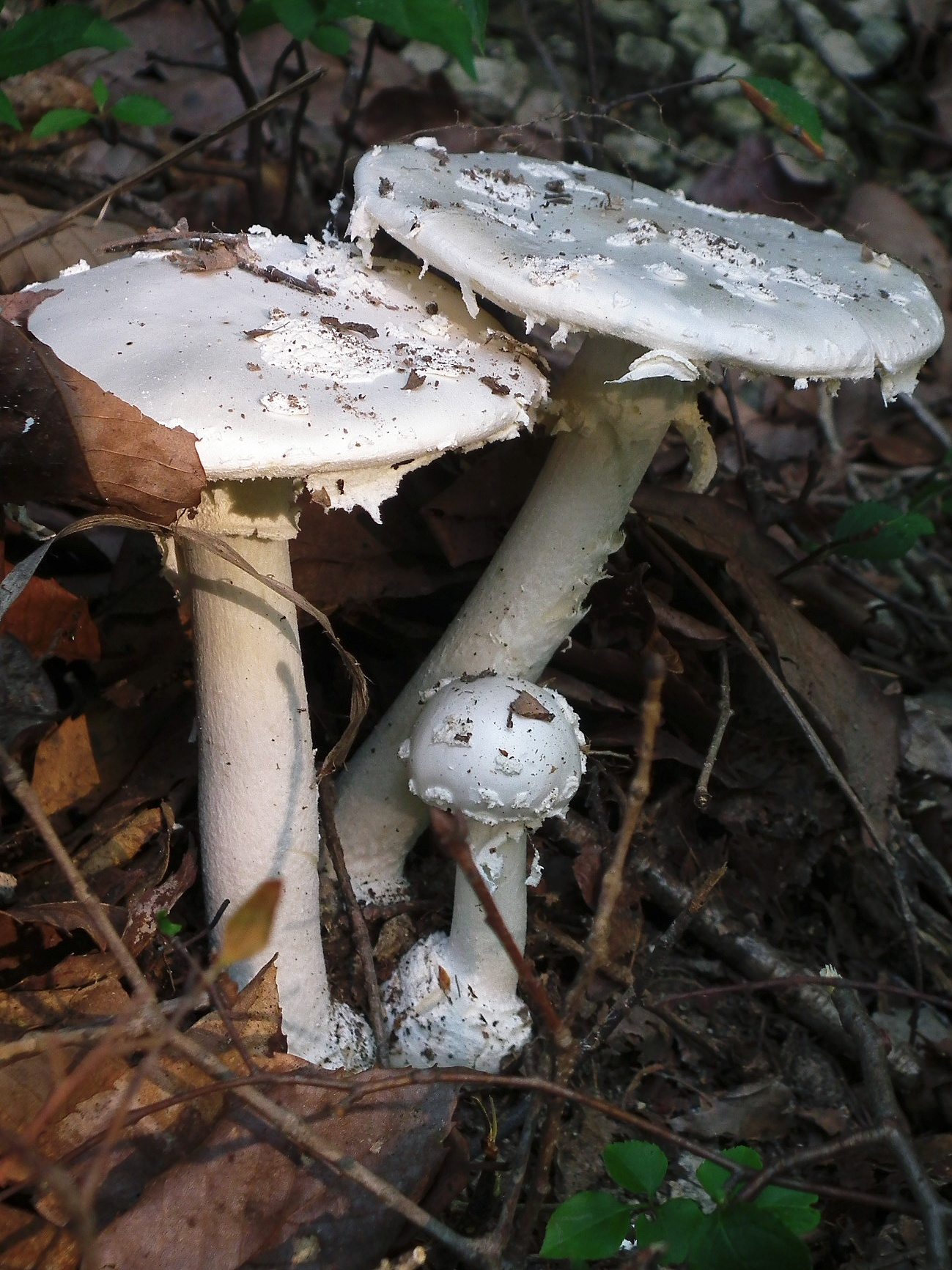

Scientific classification
- Kingdom: Fungi
- Division: Basidiomycota
- Class: Agaricomycetes
- Order: Agaricales
- Family: Amanitaceae
- Genus: Amanita
- Species: A. kotohiraensis

Binomial name
- Amanita kotohiraensis Nagas. & Mitani

= Amanita kotohiraensis =

Species of fungus

Amanita kotohiraensis
- Mycological characteristics
- Gills on hymenium
- Cap is convex or flat
- Hymenium is free
- Stipe has a ring and volva
- Spore print is white
- Ecology is mycorrhizal
- Edibility is poisonous

Amanita kotohiraensis is a species of highly toxic fungus in the family Amanitaceae native to parts of China and Japan.

A review of cases in southern China found it had been responsible for 91 poisoning cases, 1 of which was fatal, between 1994 and 2012.
