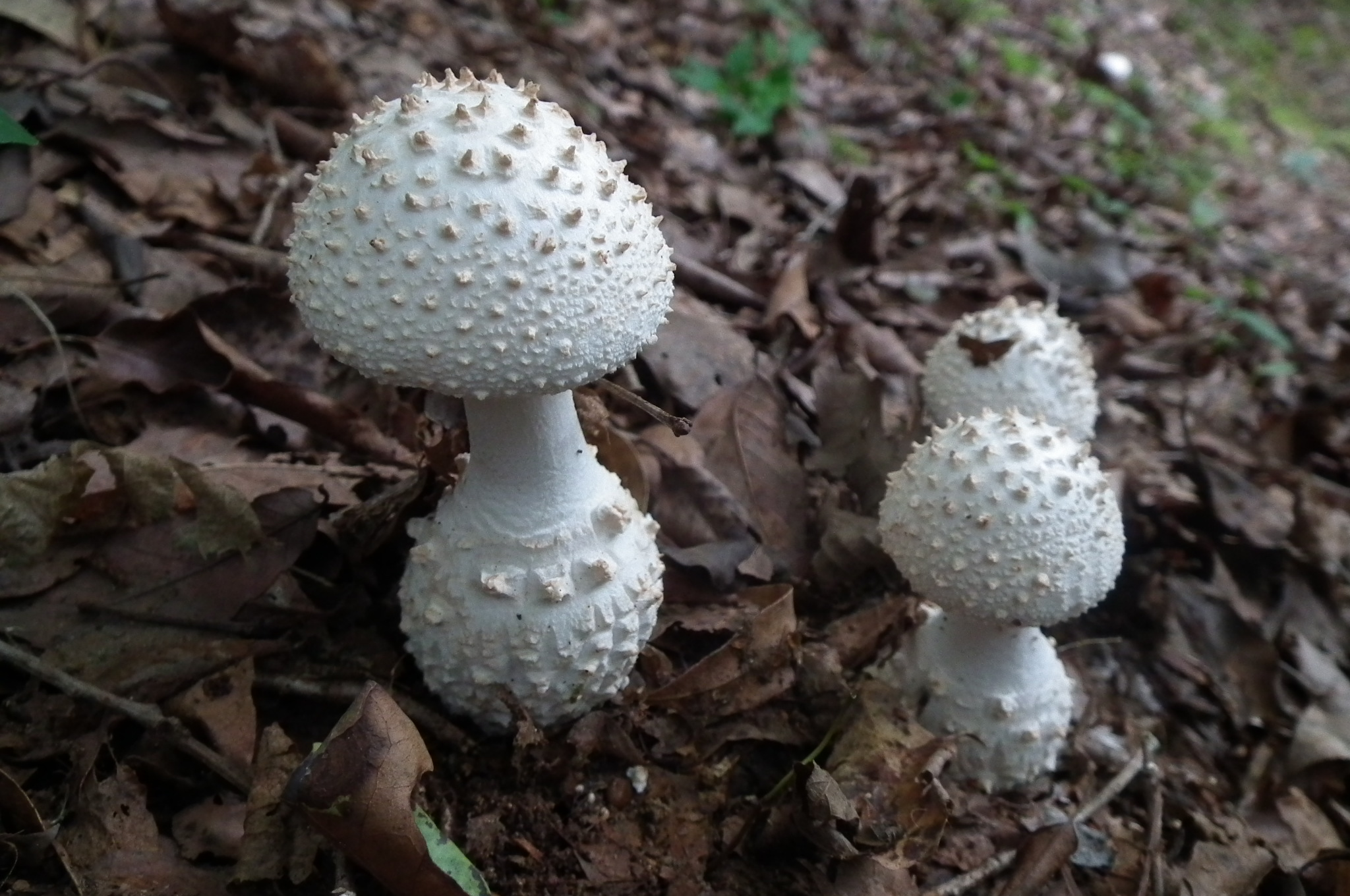

Scientific classification
- Domain: Eukaryota
- Kingdom: Fungi
- Division: Basidiomycota
- Class: Agaricomycetes
- Order: Agaricales
- Family: Amanitaceae
- Genus: Amanita
- Species: A. virgineoides

Binomial name
- Amanita virgineoides Bas

= Amanita virgineoides =

Species of fungus

Amanita virgineoides Mycological characteristics
- Gills on hymenium
- Cap is umbonate
- Hymenium is free
- Stipe has a volva
- Spore print is white
- Ecology is mycorrhizal
- Edibility is unknown but not recommended

Amanita virgineoides, known as the false virgin's lepidella, is a species of fungus in the genus Amanita.

== Description ==
The basidiocarps are medium-sized to large. The cap is 7–15 centimetres (3–6 inches) wide, convex to applanate, sometimes concave, and white, covered with white, conical to pyramid volval remnants 1–3 millimetres (1/16–1/8 in) high and wide. The cap margin is smooth and appendiculate, and the context is white and unchanging.

The gills are free to subfree and white to cream; the short gills are attenuate.

The stipe is 10–20 cm (4–8 in) × 1.5–3 cm (1/2–1 in), subcylindric or slightly attenuate upwards, white, covered with white floccose squamules; the context is white; the stipe's basal bulb is 3–4 cm (1–1 1/2 in) wide, ventricose, ovoid to subglobose, with its upper part covered with white, verrucose to granular volval remnants. The annulus is white; its upper surface bears fine, radial striations; and its lower surface, verrucose to conical warts. The annulus is often broken during expansion of the cap.

The spores measure 8–10 × 6–7.5 μm and are broadly ellipsoid to ellipsoid and amyloid. Clamps are common at bases of basidia.

== See also ==
- List of Amanita species
