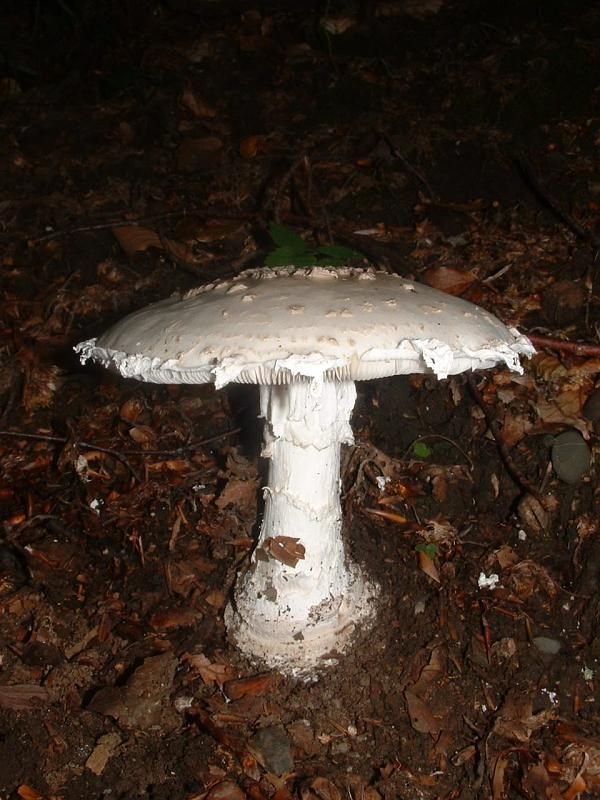

Scientific classification
- Kingdom: Fungi
- Division: Basidiomycota
- Class: Agaricomycetes
- Order: Agaricales
- Family: Amanitaceae
- Genus: Amanita
- Species: A. strobiliformis

Binomial name
- Amanita strobiliformis (Paulet ex Vittad.) Bertill.

= Amanita strobiliformis =

Species of fungus

Amanita strobiliformis
- Mycological characteristics
- Gills on hymenium
- Cap is flat
- Hymenium is free
- Spore print is white
- Ecology is mycorrhizal
- Edibility is not recommended

Amanita strobiliformis is a species of mushroom. It is commonly referred to as warted amanita.

== Description ==
The cap is 7.5 to 25.5 centimetres (3 to 10 inches) across, is rough with warts which sometimes fall away leaving the cap smooth, whitish, and sometimes has some brown. The gills are free and rounded behind. The veil is large and sometimes adhere to the margin of the cap. The stipe (stem) is 7.5 to 20 cm (3 to 8 in) long, thick, white, bulbous, and sometimes weighs a pound. The spores are elliptical.

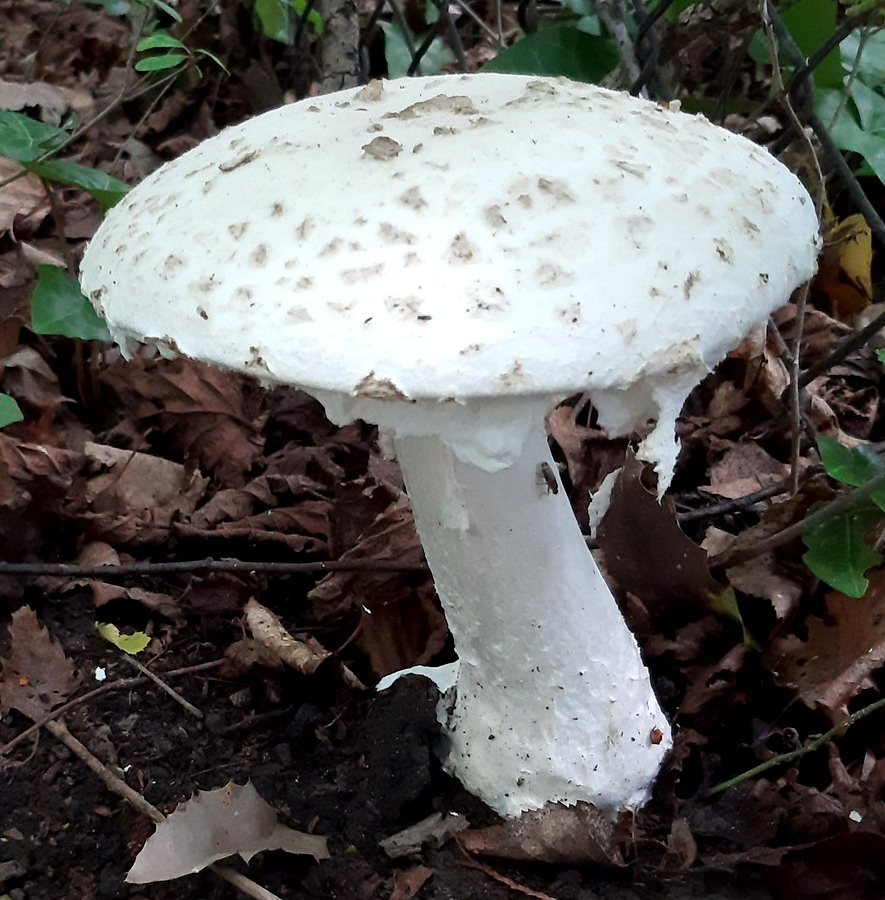
A. strobiliformis

== Distribution and ecology ==
In Europe, A. strobiliformis grows from the Mediterranean region to the Netherlands and England, and maybe further north.

It is associated mycorrhizal with deciduous trees, preferring scattered forest, or woodland borders, usually on alkaline soil. It grows singular fruits and sometimes clusters. The fungus is rare.

Adults of the North American pleasing fungus beetle Tritoma biguttata biguttata have been recorded from a supposed "A.strobiliformis"; this is probably a misidentification of A.ravenelii, and in any case it does not seem to be a regular food source for them.

== Toxicity ==
The edibility is unknown, but the genus Amanita contains some of the most toxic fungi known. Some amanitas are deadly in only very small doses, while others are relatively harmless and sometimes even considered fit for human consumption, whereby Amanita caesarea is considered a delicacy.
