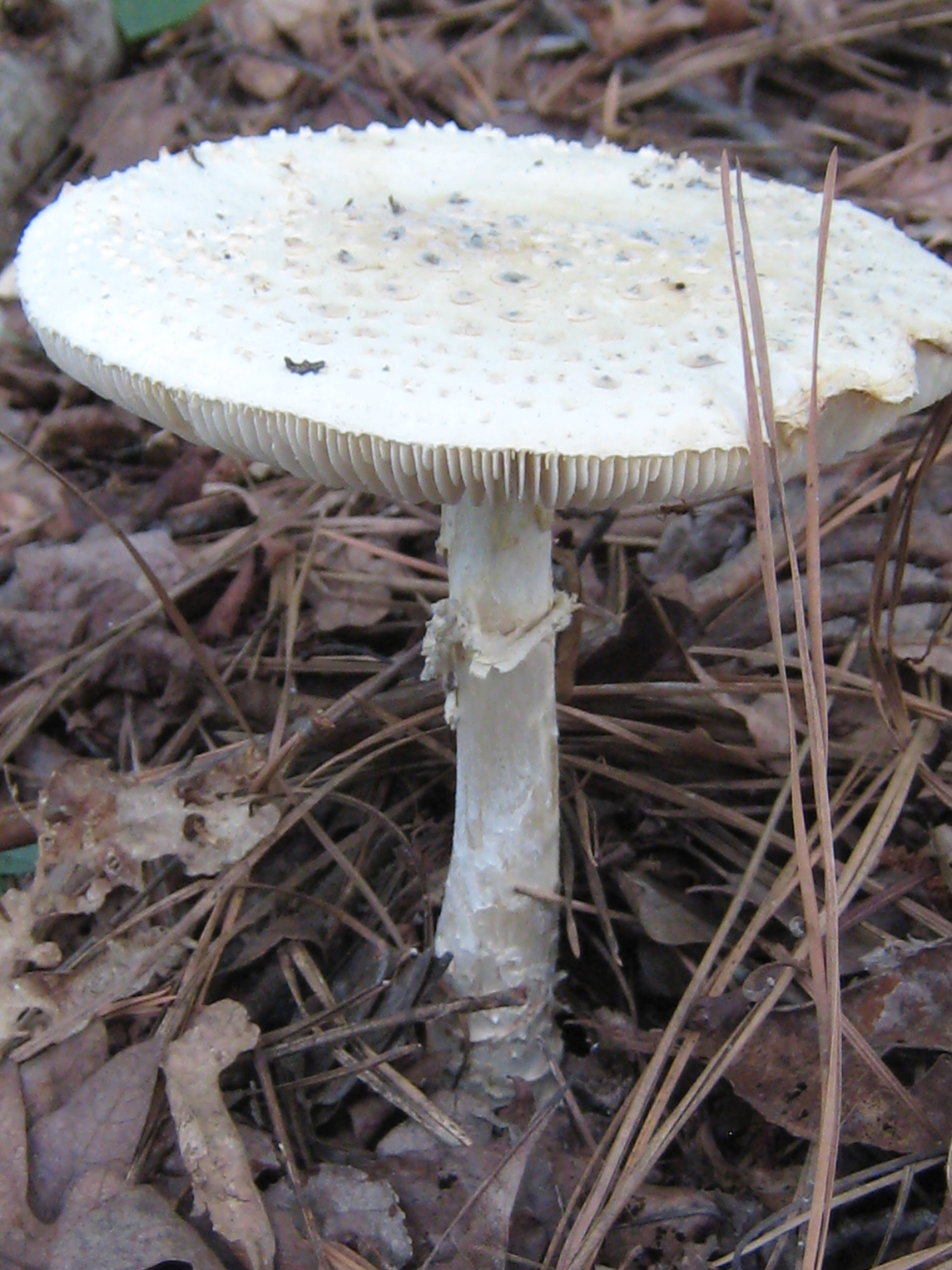

Scientific classification
- Kingdom: Fungi
- Division: Basidiomycota
- Class: Agaricomycetes
- Order: Agaricales
- Family: Amanitaceae
- Genus: Amanita
- Species: A. cokeri

Binomial name
- Amanita cokeri (E.-J.Gilbert & Kühner) E.-J.Gilbert

Synonyms
- Lepidella cokeri E.-J.Gilbert & Kühner (1928); Aspidella cokeri (E.-J.Gilbert & Kühner) E.-J.Gilbert (1940)

= Amanita cokeri =

Species of fungus

Amanita cokeri
- Mycological characteristics
- Gills on hymenium
- Cap is convex
- Hymenium is free
- Stipe has a ring and volva
- Spore print is white
- Ecology is mycorrhizal
- Edibility is poisonous

Amanita cokeri, commonly known as Coker's amanita and solitary lepidella, is a poisonous mushroom in the family Amanitaceae. First described as Lepidella cokeri in 1928, it was transferred to the genus Amanita in 1940.

== Taxonomy ==
Amanita cokeri was first described as Lepidella cokeri by mycologists E.-J.Gilbert and Robert Kühner in 1928. It was in 1940 when the species was transferred from genus Lepidella to Amanita by Gilbert. Presently, A. cokeri is placed under genus Amanita and section Roanokenses. The epithet cokeri is in honour of American mycologist and botanist William Chambers Coker.

== Description ==
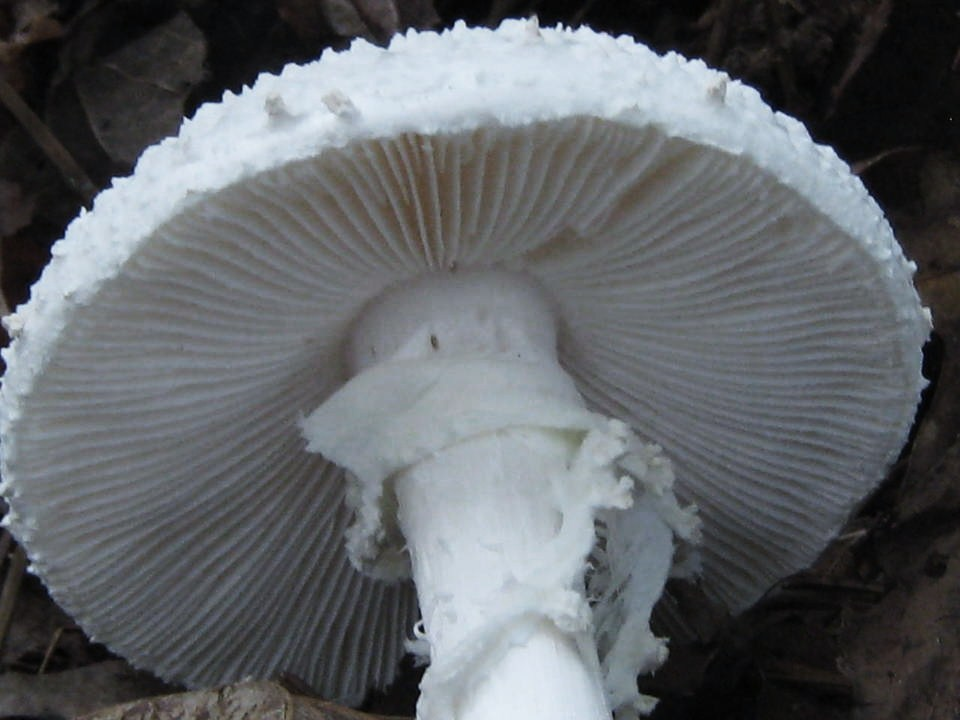
Close view of gills. Also note the cap and stipe.

Its cap is white in colour, and 7–15 centimetres (3–6 inches) across. It is oval to convex in shape. The surface is dry but sticky when wet. The cap surface is characterized by large pointed warts, white to brown in colour.

Gills are closely spaced and free from the stem. They are cream at first, but can turn white as the mushroom matures. Short-gills are frequent. Stem is white, measuring 10–20 cm (4–8 in) long and 1–2 cm (1/2–3/4 in) thick. It tapers slightly to the top, smooth to shaggy in texture. There is a ring, thick and often double-edged, the underside being tissuelike. The universal veil hangs from the top of the stipe. The basal bulb is considerably large in size, with concentric circles of down-turned scales. The volval remnants stick to it and cause irregular patches.

Spores are white, elliptical and amyloid. They measure 11–14 x 6–9 μm, and feel smooth. Flesh is white, and shows no change when exposed. There is no distinctive odour, but some specimens may develop the smell of decaying protein.

=== Similar species ===
Amanita solitaria is a closely related species, though a completely different European taxa. The notable similarity is that both it and A. cokeri are double-ringed. A. timida, from the tropical South Asia, resembles A. cokeri in its volval structure, thick and notable ring and the large bulbal base.

== Distribution and ecology ==
A. cokeri is mostly distributed in southeastern North America. It inhabits mixed coniferous or deciduous woods, growing isolated or in groups, mainly on oak and pine trees, where it leaves a white deposit, but also on the soil. It fruits from July to November.

Adults of the North American pleasing fungus beetle Tritoma biguttata biguttata have been recorded from a supposed "A.solitaria"; this might be a misidentification of A.cokeri, and in any case it does not seem to be a regular food source for them.

== Toxicity ==
In a study, the presence of non-protein amino acids 2-amino-3-cyclopropylbutanoic acid and 2-amino-5-chloro-4-pentenoic acid was revealed. The former acid was found to be toxic to the fungus Cercospora kikuchii, the arthropod Oncopeltus fasciatus and the bacteria Agrobacterium tumefaciens, Erwinia amylovora, and Xanthomonas campestris. The toxicity for bacteria could be eliminated by adding isoleucine to the medium. The other acid did not prove toxic.

== See also ==
- List of Amanita species
