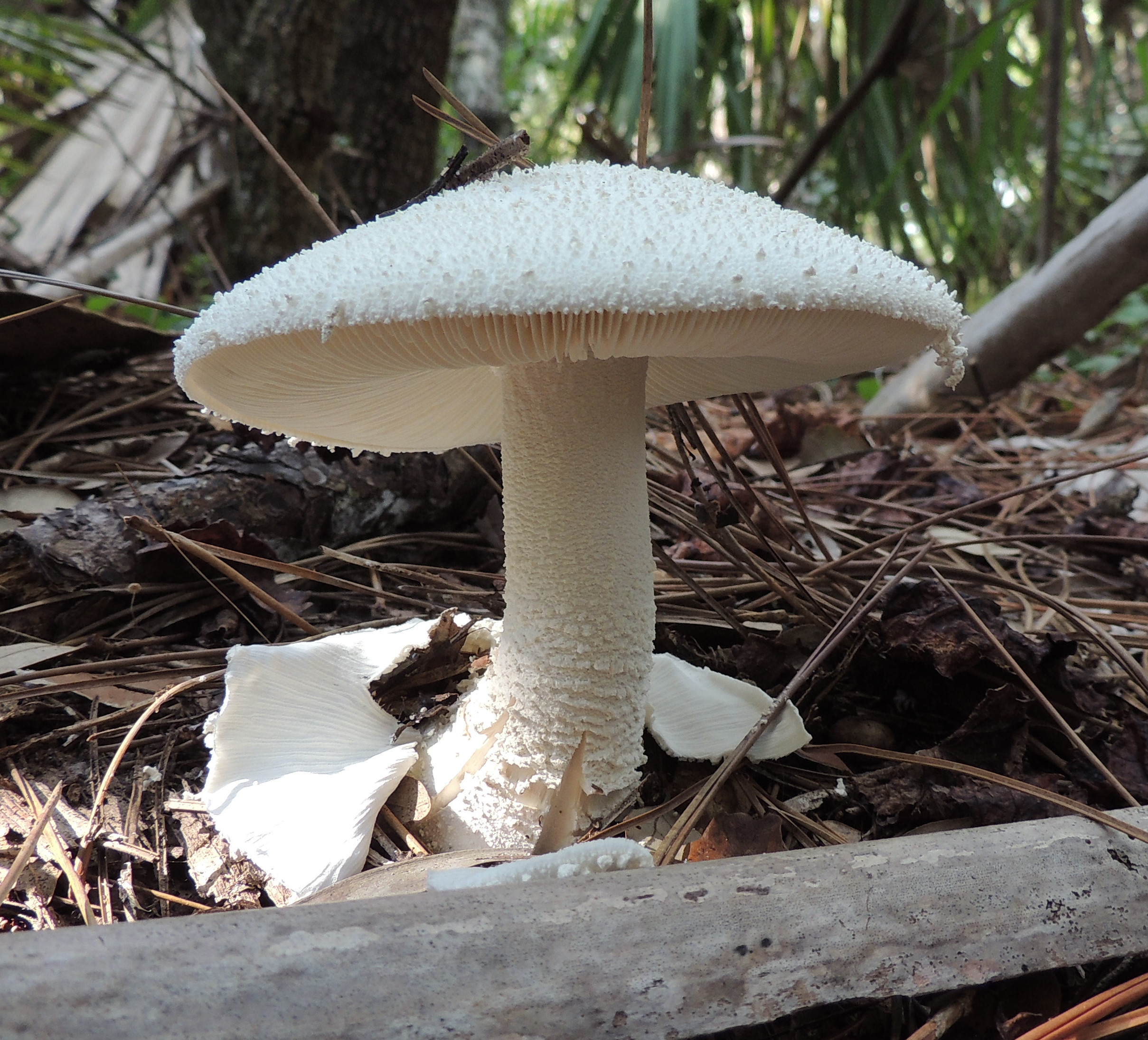

Scientific classification
- Kingdom: Fungi
- Division: Basidiomycota
- Class: Agaricomycetes
- Order: Agaricales
- Family: Amanitaceae
- Genus: Amanita
- Species: A. polypyramis

Binomial name
- Amanita polypyramis (Berk. & M.A. Curtis) Sacc. 1887

= Amanita polypyramis =

Species of mycorrhizal fungus

Amanita polypyramis
- Mycological characteristics
- Gills on hymenium
- Cap is convex or flat
- Hymenium is free
- Stipe has a ring and volva
- Spore print is white
- Ecology is mycorrhizal
- Edibility is unknown

Amanita polypyramis is a species of Amanita found in the Eastern United States. It is a large white mushroom characterized by the presence of a distinctively sweet, chlorine-like scent alongside pyramid-shaped warts that cover the surface of the cap.

Though listed in some sources as ranging from New Jersey, to Costa Rica in Central America, the species has been found as far north as New England, especially near Cape Cod.
