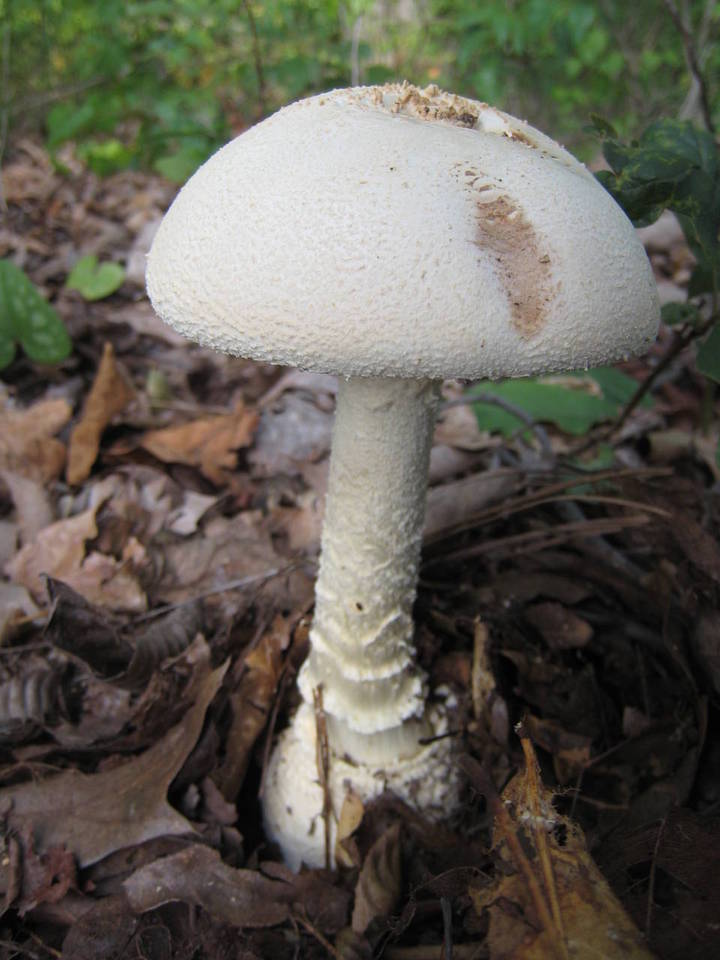

Scientific classification
- Domain: Eukaryota
- Kingdom: Fungi
- Division: Basidiomycota
- Class: Agaricomycetes
- Order: Agaricales
- Family: Amanitaceae
- Genus: Amanita
- Species: A. rhopalopus

Binomial name
- Amanita rhopalopus Bas

Synonyms
- A. radicata Peck; Amanita rhopalopus f. turbinata Basnon A. radicata Voglino

= Amanita rhopalopus =

Species of fungus

Amanita rhopalopus Mycological characteristics
- Gills on hymenium
- Cap is convex or flat
- Hymenium is free
- Stipe has a ring and volva
- Spore print is white
- Ecology is mycorrhizal
- Edibility is unknown

Amanita rhopalopus or the American Club-Footed Lepidella is a species of Amanita found in North America.
