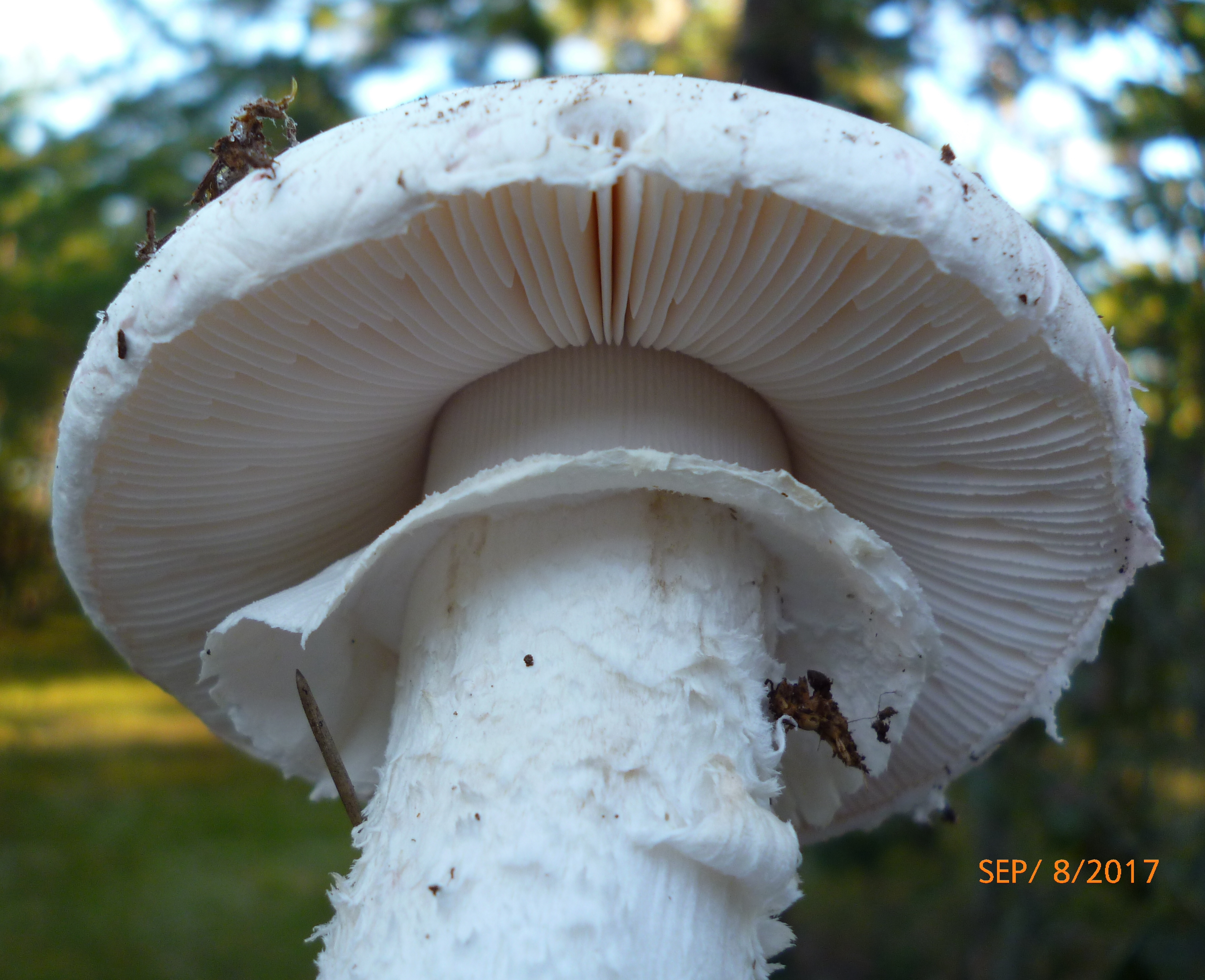

Scientific classification
- Domain: Eukaryota
- Kingdom: Fungi
- Division: Basidiomycota
- Class: Agaricomycetes
- Order: Agaricales
- Family: Amanitaceae
- Genus: Amanita
- Species: A. mutabilis

Binomial name
- Amanita mutabilis Beardslee

= Amanita mutabilis =

Species of fungus

Amanita mutabilis Mycological characteristics
- Gills on hymenium
- Cap is convex or flat
- Hymenium is free
- Stipe has a ring and volva
- Spore print is white
- Ecology is mycorrhizal
- Edibility is unknown

Amanita mutabilis is a species of Amanita from eastern United States. Amanita mutabilis has pink tones on the cap and stem, and will turn pink when its flesh is cut; it smells of anise.
