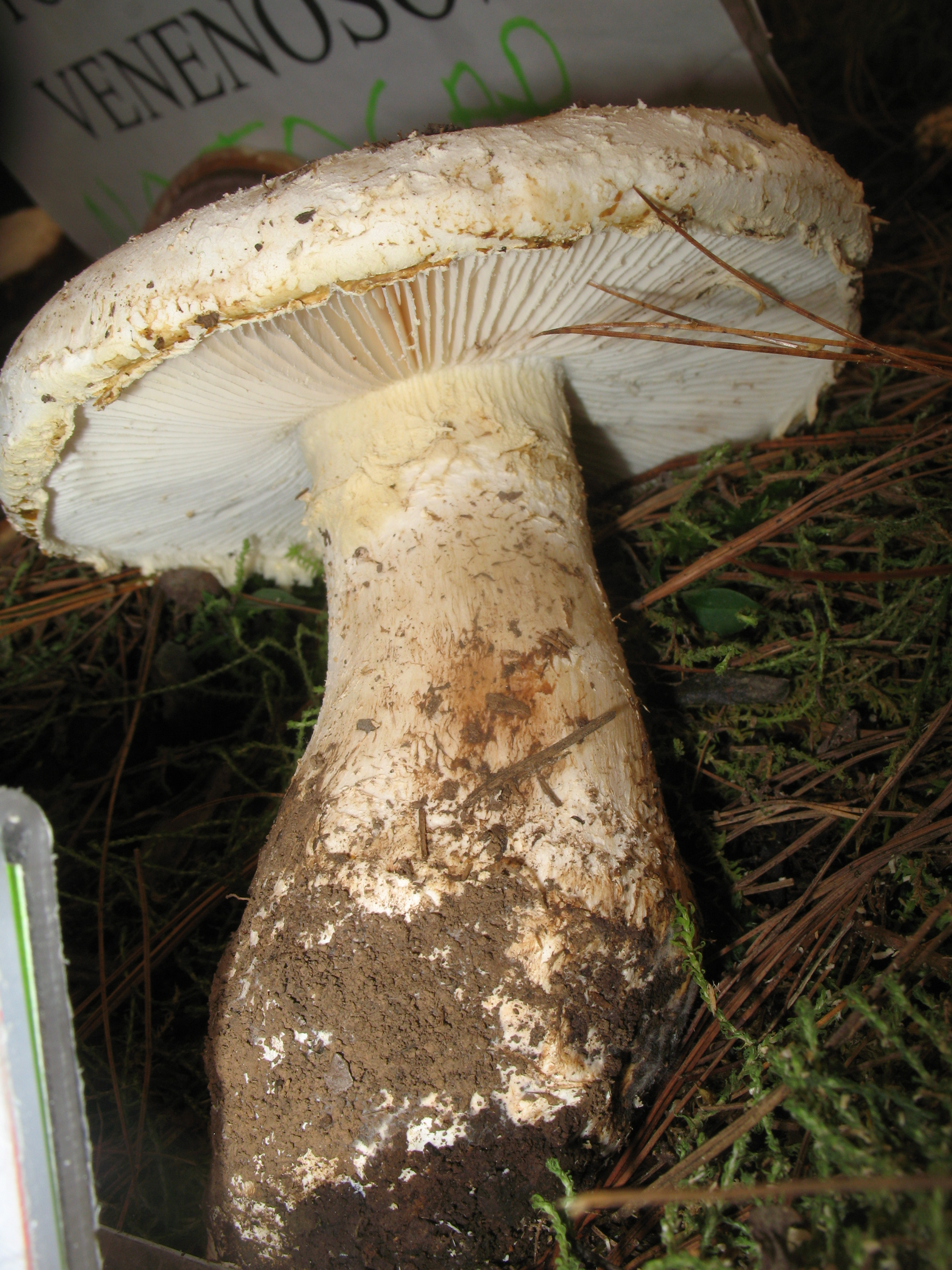

Scientific classification
- Kingdom: Fungi
- Division: Basidiomycota
- Class: Agaricomycetes
- Order: Agaricales
- Family: Amanitaceae
- Genus: Amanita
- Species: A. chlorinosma

Binomial name
- Amanita chlorinosma (Peck) Lloyd

= Amanita chlorinosma =

Species of fungus

Amanita chlorinosma
- Mycological characteristics
- Gills on hymenium
- Cap is convex or flat
- Hymenium is free
- Stipe has a ring and volva
- Spore print is white
- Ecology is mycorrhizal
- Edibility is unknown

Amanita chlorinosma, also known as the chlorine lepidella or chlorine Amanita is a North American species of Amanita. Its life cycle is perennial. Its strong, unpleasant odor easily distinguishes it.

== Description ==
A. chlorinosma has a very large cap, up to 25 centimetres (10 inches) in diameter; it is white and covered in dense, soft, powdery scales that can be easily washed off in the rain. The gills are nearly free with cottony edges. The lower third of the stipe is frequently submerged in soil and is significantly enlarged and whitish. The annulus is thin, whitish, and frequently left on the border of caps without stalk tissue. The spore print has a strong chlorine or rotten meat smell, especially when broken open or kept in a container for a while.

== Toxicity ==
A. chlorinosma is strongly considered toxic due to its many poisonous characteristics, although little research has been done on this particular species. This mushroom's poisonous nature is indicated by its large size, powdered cap, enlarged stalk base, and strong chlorine or rotten meat odor. The stem is said to be the most poisonous component. It is expected that it would cause symptoms like other Amanita species if ingested: nausea, vomiting, disorientation, abdominal aches, etc. 30 minutes to several hours after consumption, symptoms start to appear.

== Distribution and habitat ==
It can be found mainly in North Carolina (Piedmont and Coastal Plain mainly) but can range from Massachusetts and Illinois and south to Florida in pine and oak forest woodlands.

Usually, it grows in landscapes, natural settings, or forests more frequently under oak or pine trees than under pine.
