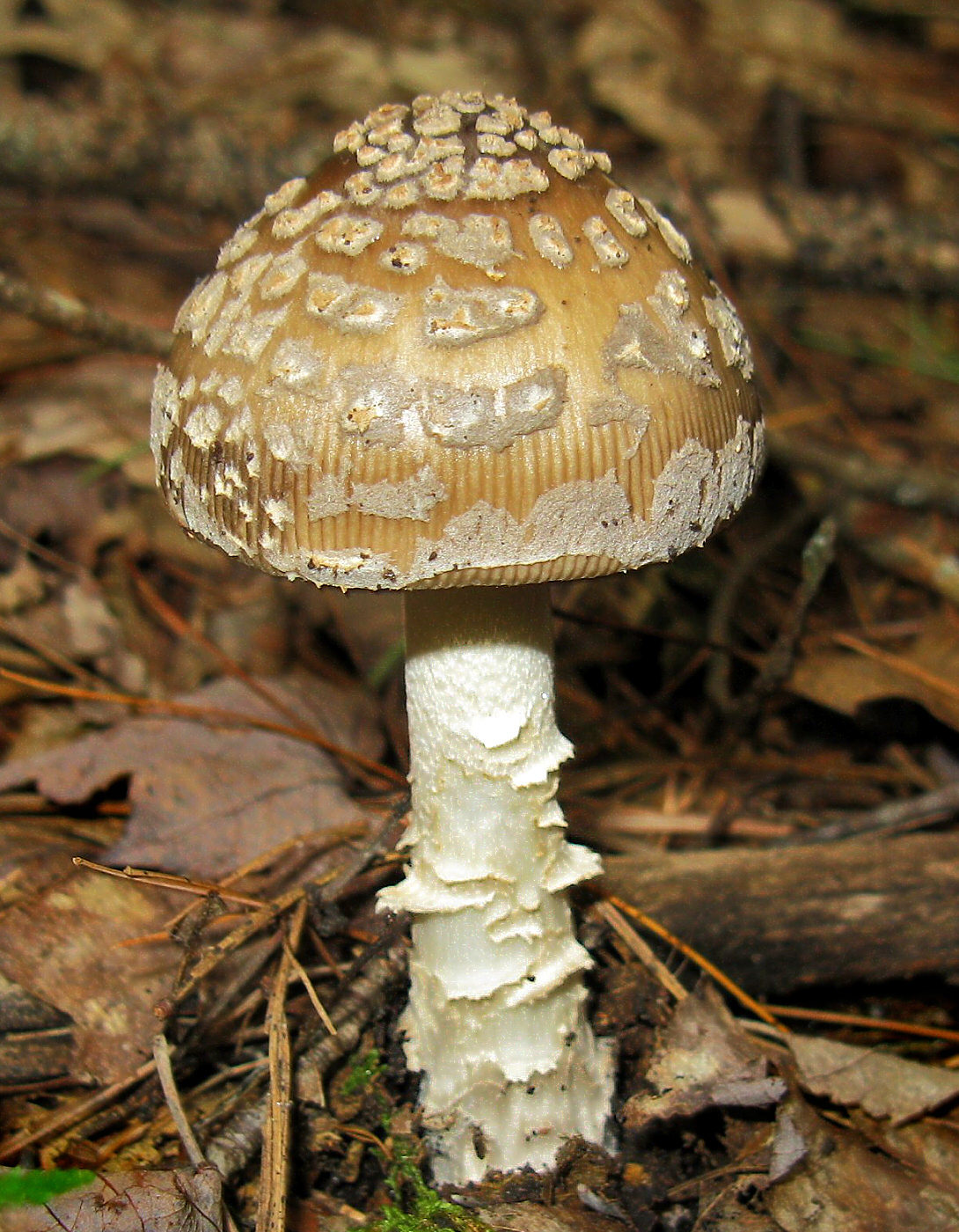

Scientific classification
- Domain: Eukaryota
- Kingdom: Fungi
- Division: Basidiomycota
- Class: Agaricomycetes
- Order: Agaricales
- Family: Amanitaceae
- Genus: Amanita
- Species: A. ceciliae

Binomial name
- Amanita ceciliae (Berk. & Broome) Bas (1984)

Synonyms
- Agaricus ceciliae Berk. & Broome (1854); Amanita inaurata Secr. (1833); Amanitopsis ceciliae (Berk. & Broome) (1992); Amanitopsis inaurata (Secr. ex Gillet) (1889)

= Amanita ceciliae =

Species of fungus

Amanita ceciliae Mycological characteristics
- Gills on hymenium
- Cap is convex or flat
- Hymenium is free
- Stipe has a volva
- Spore print is white
- Ecology is mycorrhizal
- Edibility is edible but not recommended

Amanita ceciliae, commonly called snakeskin grisette, strangulated amanita, and the Cecilia's ringless amanita, is a basidiomycete fungus in the genus Amanita. First described in 1854 by Miles Joseph Berkeley and Christopher Edmund Broome, it was given its current name by Cornelis Bas in 1984. It is characterized by bearing a large fruit body with a brown cap 5–12 cm (2.0–4.7 in) across. The cap has charcoal-grey patches, which are easily removable. The stipe is 7–18 cm (2.8–7.1 in) long, white in colour, and there is no ring on it. It is slightly tapered to the top and has irregular cottony bands girdling the base. The universal veil is grey. Spores are white, spherical in shape, non-amyloid, and measure 10.2–11.7 micrometres. The mushrooms are considered edible, but field guides typically advise caution in selecting them for consumption, due to risks of confusion with similar toxic species. A. ceciliae is found in woods throughout Europe and North America, where it fruits during summer and autumn.

== Taxonomy and etymology ==
Amanita ceciliae was first described by Miles Joseph Berkeley, an English cryptogamist and clergyman, and Christopher Edmund Broome, a British mycologist, in 1854. It is placed in the genus Amanita and section Vaginatae. Section Vaginatae consists of mushrooms with special characteristics – such as the absence of a ring, and very few clamp connections at the bases of the basidia.

The name Amanita inaurata, given by Swiss mycologist Louis Secretan in 1833, has also been used for this species. In 1978, the name was declared nomenclaturally incorrect according to the rules of International Code of Botanical Nomenclature. Other synonyms are Agaricus ceciliae, Amanitopsis inaurata and Amanitopsis ceciliae. The present name, Amanita ceciliae, was given by Cornelis Bas, a Dutch mycologist, in 1984.

The species is commonly called "snakeskin grisette". Another common name is "strangulated amanita", referring to the tightly clasping volva. It is also called Cecilia's ringless amanita after Cecilia Berkeley, the wife of M. J. Berkeley. The name was meant "to record the services which have been rendered to Mycology by many excellent illustrations and in other ways".

== Description ==
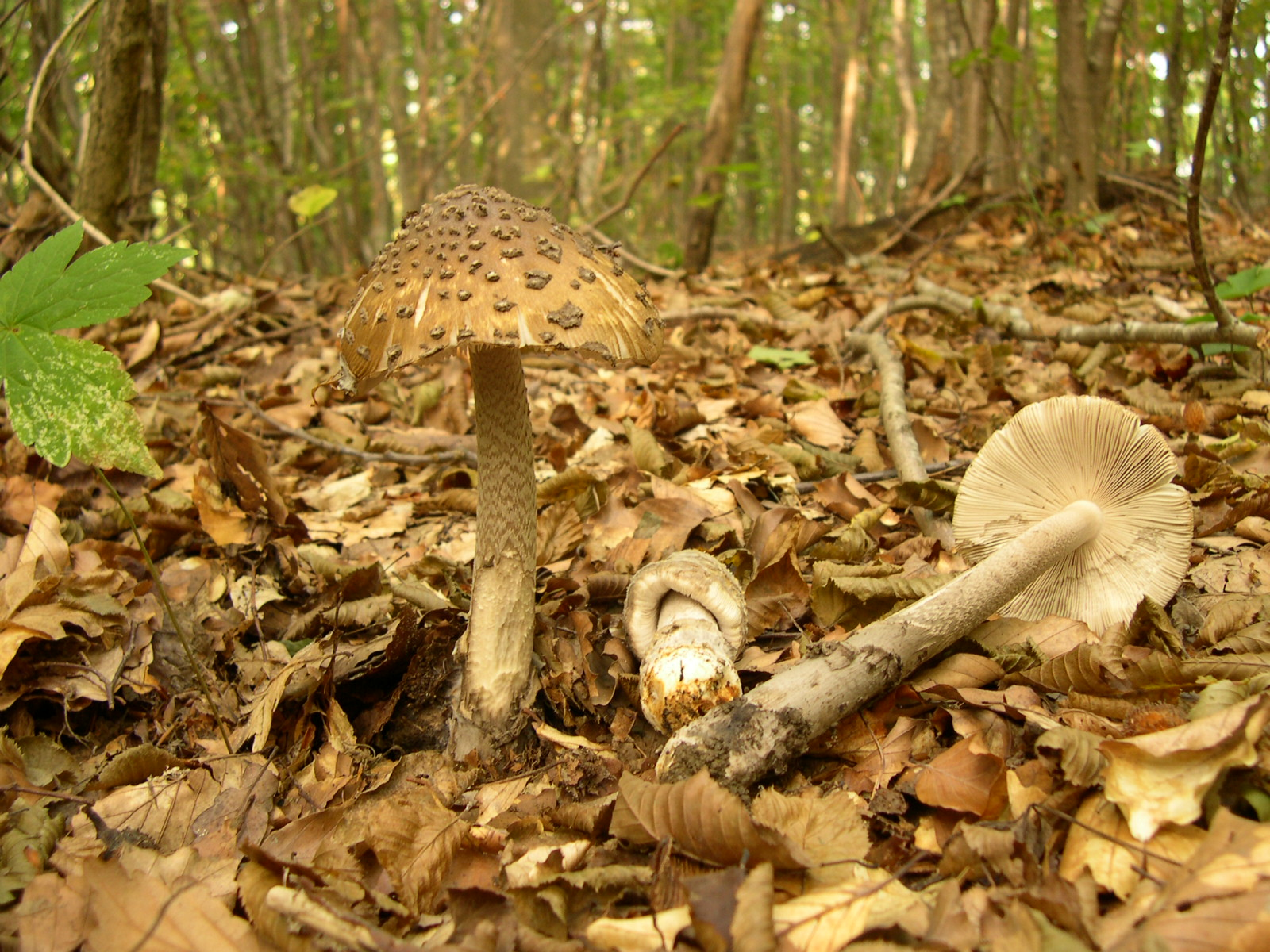
A collection of Amanita ceciliae showing typical colouration, from mountains in Piacenza.

Amanita ceciliae is characterized by bearing a large fruit body with a brown cap 5–12 cm (2.0–4.7 in) across. The cap has charcoal-grey patches, which are easily removable. The stipe is 7–18 cm (2.8–7.1 in) long, white in colour, and there is no ring on it. It is slightly tapered to the top, and has irregular cottony bands girdling the base.

The universal veil is grey. Spores are white, spherical in shape, non-amyloid, and measure 10.2–11.7 micrometres.

The cap is 5–12 cm (2.0–4.7 in) across, shape ranging from convex to flat. It is upturned, and has a deep-coloured margin. There is a low umbo. It is grey to a brownish black in colour, darkest in the center and paler towards the margin. Generally smooth, the cap surface is slightly sticky when moist. The cap surface is characterized by having loose, fleecy, charcoal-grey patches of volval remnants scattered across it. The patches are easily removed. The margin is strongly striated. The cap colour may vary, and pale forms are known to exist, for example, as in the types A. c. f. decolora and A. c. var. pallida. A. c. var. royeri, first described by mycologist L. Maire in 2008 and occurring in France, is a cinder black-capped variation.

Gills are free and closely spaced, and white in colour. They can be thick, and are often forked. The stem is 7–18 cm (2.8–7.1 in) long, and 120–200 mm (4.7–7.9 in) x 20–40 mm (0.79–1.57 in) thick. It is lightly stuffed (filled with a cottony tissue) and then hollow, and there is a slight tapering to the top. It is white in colour, with flat grey hairs, often in a zig-zag pattern. It does not bear a ring and has fragile, cottony, brownish or charcoal-coloured oblique girdles of volval remnants around the stem base and lower stem. The volva is white to grey, powdery and delicate. The flesh is white and does not change colour when cut. Although it lacks any distinctive odor, it tastes sweet.

Spores are white in colour, spherical and are not amyloid. They measure 10.2–11.7 μm. A few large-sized spores are commonly found in a mount of gill tissue. Clamps are not found at bases of basidia.

=== Look-alikes ===
Amanita sinicoflava (occurring in North America) looks quite similar, but it has a sack-like volva, unlike A. ceciliae. A. antillana, of the Antilles islands, is somewhat the same, but it has ellipsoid spores unlike the spherical ones of A. ceciliae. A. ceciliae is often used as a misnomer for A. borealisorora, which largely occurs in North America. A. borealisorora is a provisional name, and the species has not yet been validly published. The spores of A. ceciliae highly resemble those of A. cinctipes (mainly found in Singapore), though the former has larger spores. The discolouration in the volva of A. colombiana (from Colombia, as its name states) probably shows a relationship between the mushroom and A. ceciliae. A. sorocula is another lookalike. This Colombian and Mesoamerican species is often mistaken for A. ceciliae, as both mushrooms have a volva with a weak structure and greying gills. The notable difference is the strong yellow colour of the cap in immature A. ceciliae mushrooms. A. sorocula is not yet validly published, and currently is a newly accepted name. The Chinese species A. liquii is similar but the yellow-brown, red-brown or green-brown coloured cap of A. ceciliae are much different from the brown-black cap of A. liquii. Also, the volval remnants of A. ceciliae converge at the base to form a ring-like zone, unlike A. liquii. Apart from this, the cellular pigments in the sterile strip around the gills and volval remnants are much darker in colour compared to A. ceciliae.

=== Edibility ===
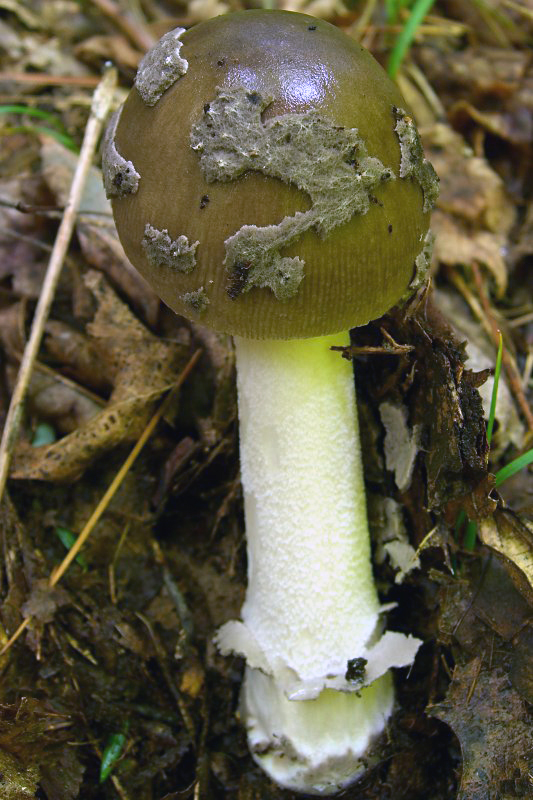
An immature specimen from the southern Appalachian Mountains

Amanita ceciliae is considered an edible mushroom and used as food, although many field guides recommend to avoid eating it. Others recommend it as a good edible species.

== Ecology and habitat ==
Europe

In Europe, Amanita ceciliae is widespread everywhere, though infrequently encountered. It often inhabits deciduous forests with hornbeam (Carpinus), oak (Quercus), beech (Fagus) and birch (Betula), but it can also rarely occur with conifers: pine (Pinus), fir (Abies), spruce (Picea) and cedar (Cedrus). It has a preference for neutral to calcareous soils.

North America

In North America, it is found mainly in areas east of the Mississippi River, but similar mushrooms also occur in the Pacific Northwest, the Southwest, and Texas. Its range also stretches south into Mexico. They are ecologically mycorrhizal, and habitats include hardwood forests and coniferous forests. The mushroom grows alone, scattered, or in groups during summer and autumn. It is primarily eastern in distribution but also reported in the Pacific Northwest, the Southwest, and Texas (with an apparent association with pecan trees).

=== Introduced species ===
Apart from its native area, A. ceciliae has also been reported from Asia. These regions include Japan, Azad Kashmir and Iran. There is speculation that North American collections could possibly be an undescribed species differing from the European A. ceciliae.

== See also ==
- List of Amanita species
