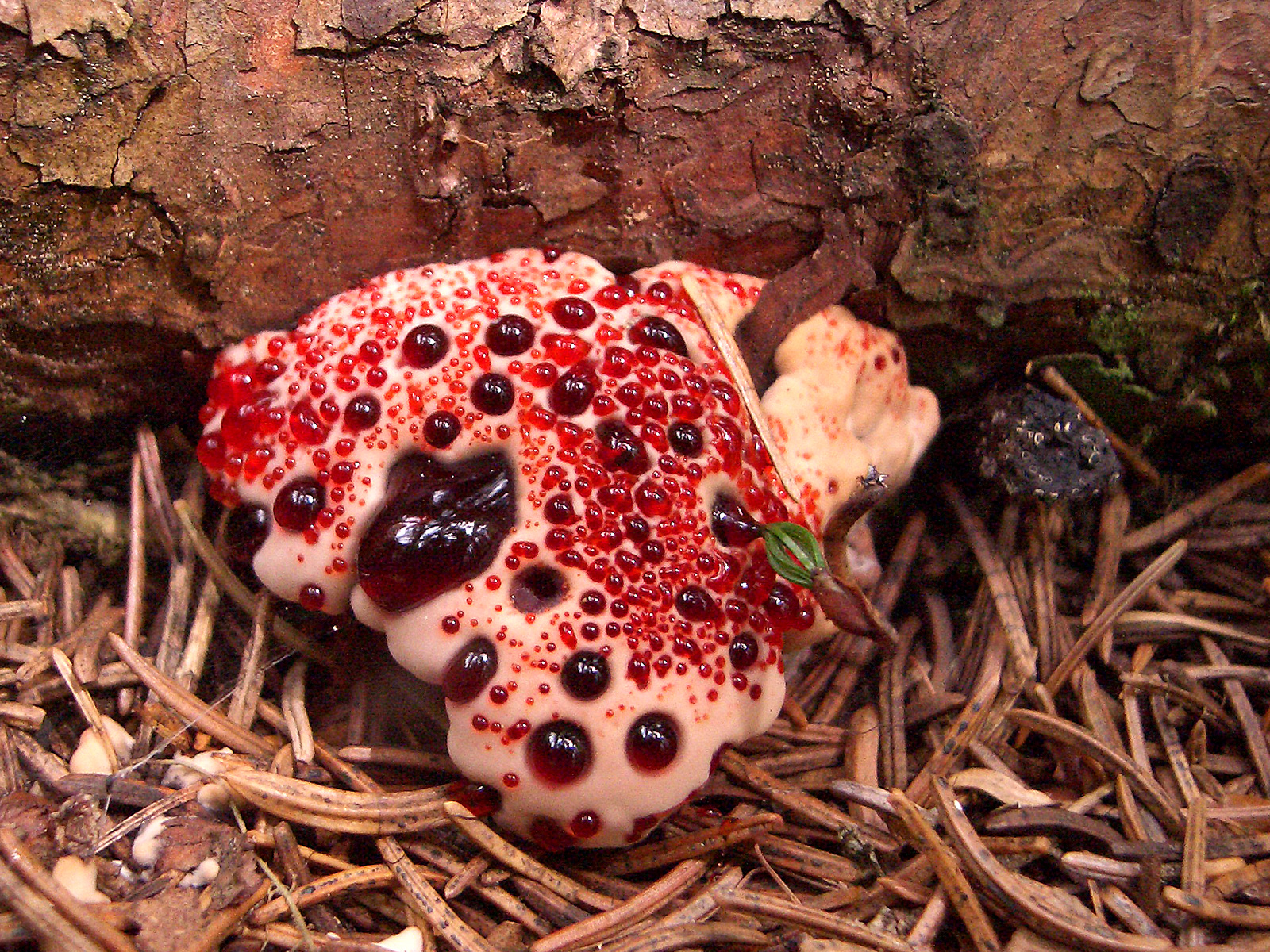
- Bleeding tooth fungus

Scientific classification
- Kingdom: Fungi
- Division: Basidiomycota
- Class: Agaricomycetes
- Order: Thelephorales
- Family: Bankeraceae
- Genus: Hydnellum
- Species: H. peckii

Binomial name
- Hydnellum peckii Banker (1912)

Synonyms
- Hydnum peckii (Banker) Sacc. (1925); Calodon peckii (Banker) Snell & E.A.Dick (1956)

= Hydnellum peckii =

Species of fungus

Hydnellum peckii
- Mycological characteristics
- Teeth on hymenium
- Cap is depressed or convex
- Hymenium attachment is not applicable
- Lacks a stipe
- Spore print is brown
- Ecology is mycorrhizal
- Edibility is edible, but unpalatable

Hydnellum peckii is a fungus in the genus Hydnellum of the family Bankeraceae. The unusual appearance of the young fruit bodies has earned the species several descriptive common names, including strawberries and cream, the bleeding Hydnellum, the bleeding tooth fungus, the red-juice tooth, and the Devil's tooth.

The fruit bodies typically have a funnel-shaped cap with a white edge, although the shape can vary greatly. Young, moist fruit bodies can "bleed" bright red guttation droplets. Although the fruit bodies are readily identifiable when young, they become brown and nondescript with age. It is a hydnoid species, producing spores on the surface of vertical spines or tooth-like projections that hang from the undersurface of the fruit bodies.

The species is found in North America, Europe, and was discovered in Iran (2008) and Korea (2010). It is mycorrhizal, forming mutually beneficial relationships with a variety of coniferous trees, growing on the ground singly, scattered, or in fused masses. They are considered inedible, but the guttation droplets contain atromentin, a pigment with anticoagulant properties similar to heparin.

== Taxonomy ==
The species was first described scientifically by American mycologist Howard James Banker in 1913. Italian Pier Andrea Saccardo placed the species in the genus Hydnum in 1925, while Walter Henry Snell and Esther Amelia Dick placed it in Calodon in 1956; Hydnum peckii (Banker) Sacc. and Calodon peckii Snell & E.A. Dick are synonyms of Hydnellum peckii.

The fungus is classified in the stirps (species thought to be descendants of a common ancestor) Diabolum of the genus Hydnellum, a grouping of similar species with the following shared characteristics: flesh that is marked with concentric lines that form alternating pale and darker zones (zonate); an extremely peppery taste; a sweetish odor; spores that are ellipsoid, and not amyloid (that is, not absorbing iodine when stained with Melzer's reagent), acyanophilous (not staining with the reagent Cotton Blue), and covered with tubercules; the presence of clamp connections in the hyphae.

=== Etymology ===
The specific eponym honors mycologist Charles Horton Peck. The fungus is known in the vernacular by several names, including "strawberries and cream", the "bleeding Hydnellum", the "red-juice tooth", "Peck's hydnum", the "bleeding tooth fungus", and the "devil's tooth".

== Description ==
As in all mushroom-producing fungi, the fruit bodies (sporocarps) are the reproductive structures that are produced from fungal mycelium when the appropriate environmental conditions of temperature, humidity and nutrient availability are met. Hydnellum peckii is a stipitate hydnoid fungus, meaning that it has a cap atop a stipe (stem), and a form resembling a Hydnum—characterized by a teeth-like hymenium, rather than gills or pores on the underside of the cap. Fruit bodies growing closely together often appear to fuse together (this is called "confluence"). They can reach a height of up to 10.5 cm (4 1/8 in). Fresh fruit bodies exude a striking, thick red fluid when they are moist, present even in young specimens, which are lumplike in appearance.

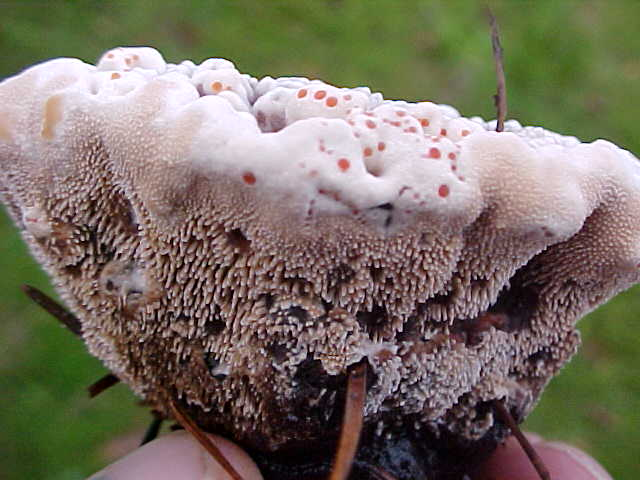
The "teeth" covering the cap's underside are specialized structures that produce spores.

The cap's surface is convex to flattened, more or less uneven and sometimes slightly depressed in the center. It is usually densely covered with "hairs" that give it a texture similar to felt or velvet; these hairs are sloughed off in age, leaving the caps of mature specimens smooth. Its shape varies from somewhat round to irregular, 4 to 10 cm (1 5/8 to 3 7/8 in), or even as much as 20 cm (7 7/8 in) wide as a result of confluence. The cap is initially whitish, but later turns slightly brownish, with irregular dark-brown to nearly black blotches where it is bruised. In maturity, the surface is fibrous and tough, scaly and jagged, grayish brown in the upper part of the cap, and somewhat woody. The flesh is a pale pinkish brown. The spore print is brown.

The spines are slender, cylindrical and tapering (terete), less than 5 mm (1/4 in) long, and become shorter closer to the cap edge. They are crowded together, with typically between three and five teeth per square millimeter. Pinkish white initially, they age to a grayish brown. The stem is thick, very short, and often deformed. It becomes bulbous where it penetrates the ground, and may root into the soil for several centimeters. Although it may reach up to 5 cm (2 in) in total length, and is 1 to 3 cm (3/8 to 1 1/8 in) wide, only about 0.1 to 1 cm (1/16 to 3/8 in) appear above ground. The upper part is covered with the same teeth found on the underside of the cap, whereas the lower part is hairy and often encases debris from the forest floor. The odor of the fruit body has been described as "mild to disagreeable", or, as Banker suggested in his original description, similar to hickory nuts.

=== Microscopic features ===
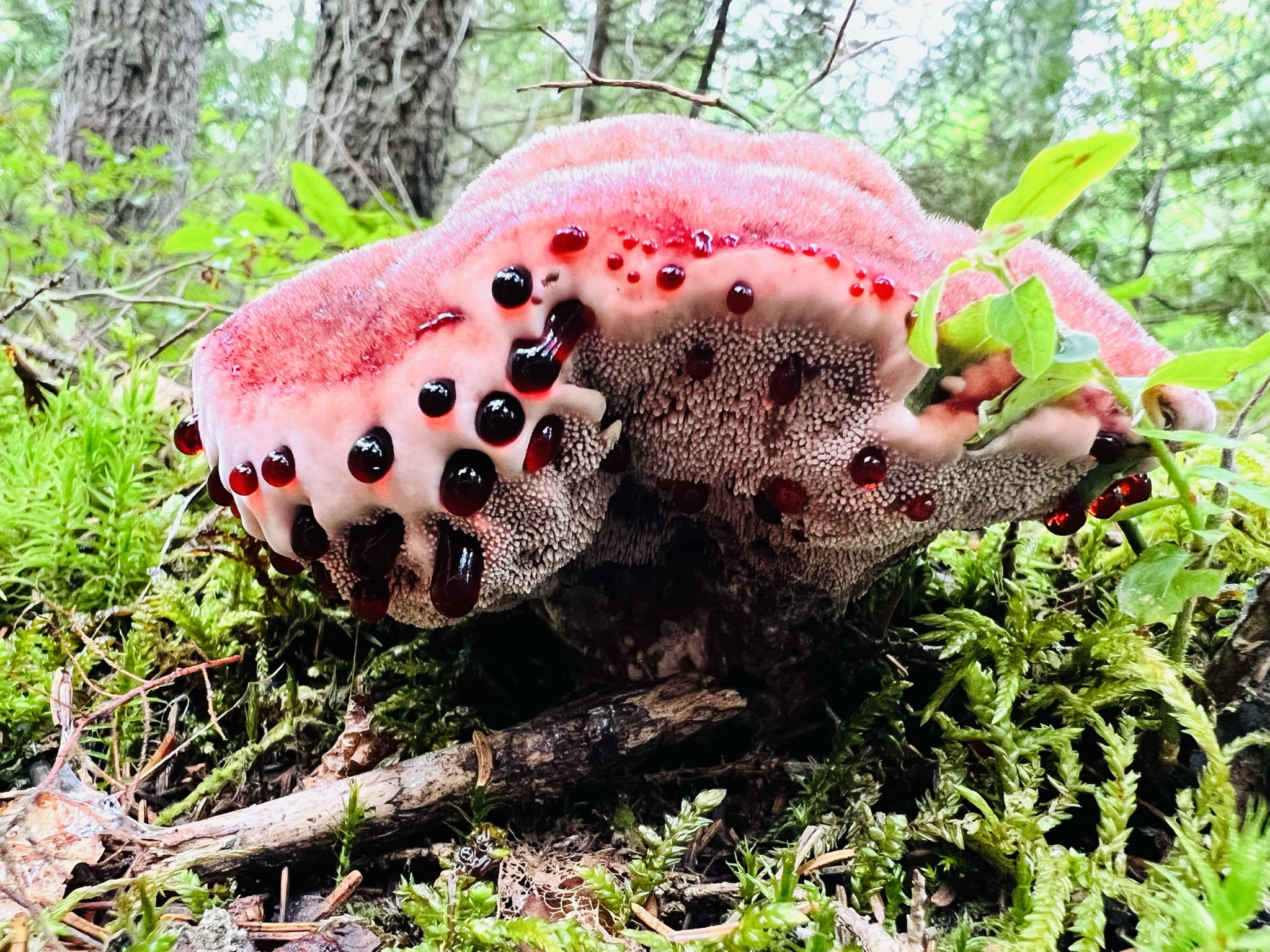
Hydnellum peckii, Gaspereau Mountain (Wolfville), Nova Scotia

In deposit, the spores appear brown. Viewing them with a light microscope reveals finer details of their structure: they are roughly spherical but end abruptly in a small point, their surfaces are covered with small, wart-like nodules, and their size is between 5.0–5.3 by 4.0–4.7 μm. The spores are inamyloid, meaning they do not absorb iodine when stained with Melzer's reagent.

Hydnellum peckii's cells (the hyphae) also present various characters useful for its characterization. The hyphae that form the cap are hyaline (translucent), smooth, thin-walled, and 3–4 μm thick. They collapse when dry, but may be readily revived with a weak (2%) solution of potassium hydroxide. Those in the cap form an intricate tangle with a tendency to run longitudinally. They are divided into cellular compartments (septa) and have clamp connections—short branches connecting one cell to the previous cell to allow passage of the products of nuclear division. The basidia, the spore-bearing cells in the hymenium, are club-shaped, four-spored, and measure 35–40 by 4.7–6 μm.

=== Similar species ===
Hydnellum diabolus (the species epithet is given the neuter diabolum in some publications) has a very similar appearance, so much so that some consider it and H. peckii to be synonymous; H. diabolus is said to have a sweetish pungent odor that is lacking in H. peckii. The differences between the two species are amplified in mature specimens: H. diabolus has an irregularly thickened stem, while the stem of H. peckii is thickened by a "definite spongy layer". Additionally, old specimens of H. peckii have a smooth cap, while H. diabolus is tomentose. The related species H. pineticola also exudes pink droplets of liquid when young and moist. Commonly found growing under conifers in northeastern North America, H. pineticola tastes "unpleasant", but not acrid. Fruit bodies tend to grow singly, rather than in fused clusters, and, unlike H. peckii, they do not have bulbous stems.

Molecular analysis based on the sequences of the internal transcribed spacer DNA of several Hydnellum species placed H. peckii as most closely related to H. ferrugineum and H. spongiosipes.

Abortiporus biennis has no teeth but produces red droplets from exposed pores.

== Ecology ==
Hydnellum peckii is a mycorrhizal fungus, and as such establishes a mutualistic relationship with the roots of certain trees (referred to as "hosts"), in which the fungus exchanges minerals and amino acids extracted from the soil for fixed carbon from the host. The subterranean hyphae of the fungus grow a sheath of tissue around the rootlets of a broad range of tree species, in an intimate association that is especially beneficial to the host (termed ectomycorrhizal), as the fungus produces enzymes that mineralize organic compounds and facilitate the transfer of nutrients to the tree.

It forms ectomycorrhizal associations primarily with conifer species such as Picea abies and Pinus sylvestris, exchanging soil nutrients for photosynthetically derived carbon from its host trees. Field studies suggest that it prefers acidic, moss-covered soils and can act as a bioindicator of undisturbed old-growth forest ecosystems..The ectomycorrhizal structures of H. peckii are among a few in the Bankeraceae that have been studied in detail. They are characterized by a plectenchymatous mantle—a layer of tissue made of hyphae tightly arranged in a parallel orientation, or palisade, and which rarely branch or overlap each other. These hyphae, along with adhering mineral soil particles, are embedded in a gelatinous matrix. The hyphae of the ectomycorrhizae can become chlamydospores, an adaptation that helps the fungus tolerate unfavorable conditions. Chlamydospores of H. peckii have a peculiar structure—markedly distinct from those of other Bankeraceae—with thick, smooth inner walls and an outer wall that is split radially into warts. The most striking characteristic of the ectomycorrhizae as a whole is the way the black outer layers of older sections are shed, giving a "carbonized appearance". The majority of the underground biomass of the fungus is concentrated near the surface, most likely as "mycelial mats"—dense clusters of ectomycorrhizae and mycelium. The mycelium is also known to extend far beyond the site of the fruit bodies, as far as 337 cm (11 ft) away.

Molecular techniques have been developed to help with conservation efforts of stipitate hydnoid fungi, including H. peckii. While the distribution of the fungus has traditionally been determined by counting the fruit bodies, this method has a major drawback in that fruit bodies are not produced consistently every year, and the absence of fruit bodies is not an indication of the absence of its mycelium in the soil. More modern techniques using the polymerase chain reaction to assess the presence of the fungal DNA in the soil have helped alleviate the issues in monitoring the presence and distribution of fungi mycelia.

== Habitat and distribution ==
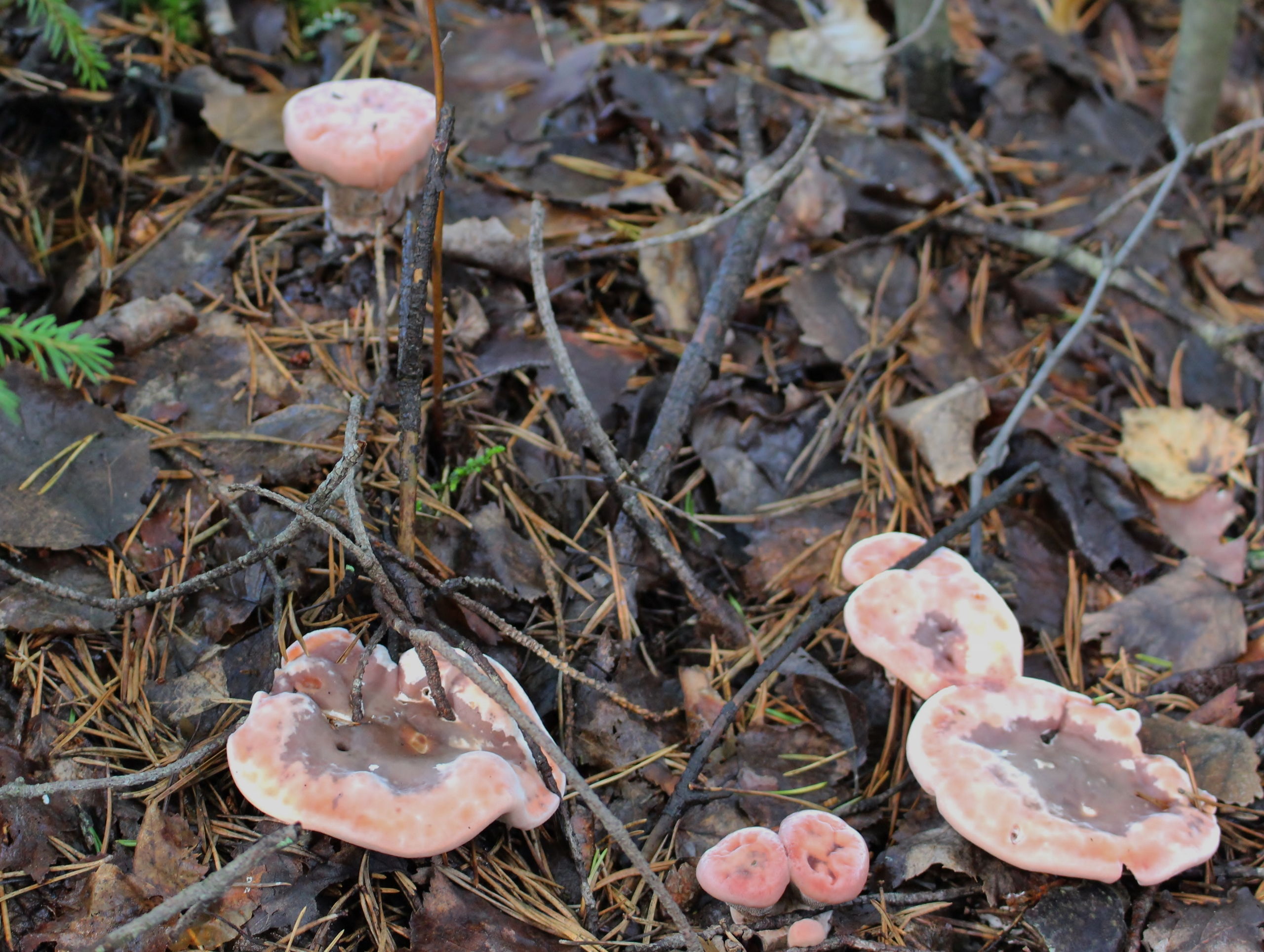
Fruit bodies can grow solitarily, scattered, or clustered together. Location: Tusby, Finland.

The fruit bodies of Hydnellum peckii are found growing solitary, scattered, or clustered together on the ground under conifers, often among mosses and pine needle litter. H. peckii is a "late-stage" fungus that, in boreal forests dominated by jack pine, typically begins associating with more mature hosts once the canopy has closed. A preference for mountainous or subalpine ecosystems has been noted.

The fungus has a wide distribution in North America, and is particularly common in the Pacific Northwest; its range extends north to Alaska and east to North Carolina. In the Puget Sound area of the U.S. state of Washington, it is found in association with Douglas-fir, fir, and hemlock. Along the Oregon Coast it has been collected under lodgepole pine. In addition to North America, the mushroom is widespread in Europe, and its presence has been documented in Italy, Germany, and Scotland. The species is common in the latter location, but becoming increasingly rare in several European countries, such as Norway, The Netherlands, and the Czech Republic. Increased pollution in central Europe has been suggested as one possible factor in the mushroom's decline there. Reports from Iran in 2008 and Korea in 2010 were the first outside Europe and North America.

== Uses ==
Fruit bodies of H. peckii have been described as resembling "Danish pastry topped with strawberry jam". Hydnellum species are not known to be poisonous, but they are not particularly edible due to their foul taste. This acrid taste persists even in dried specimens.

The fruit bodies of this and other Hydnellum species are prized by mushroom dyers. The colors may range from beige when no mordant is used, to various shades of blue or green depending on the mordant added.

== Chemistry ==
Structural formula of atromentin

Screening of an extract of Hydnellum peckii revealed the presence of an effective anticoagulant, named atromentin (2,5-dihydroxy-3,6-bis(4-hydroxyphenyl)-1,4-benzoquinone), and similar in biological activity to the well-known anticoagulant heparin. Atromentin also possesses antibacterial activity, inhibiting the enzyme enoyl-acyl carrier protein reductase (essential for the biosynthesis of fatty acids) in the bacteria Streptococcus pneumoniae.

Hydnellum peckii can bioaccumulate the metal caesium. In one Swedish field study, as much as 9% of the total caesium of the topmost 10 cm (3 7/8 in) of soil was found in the fungal mycelium. In general, ectomycorrhizal fungi, which grow most prolifically in the upper organic horizons of the soil or at the interface between the organic and mineral layers, are involved in the retention and cycling of caesium-137 in organic-rich forest soils.
