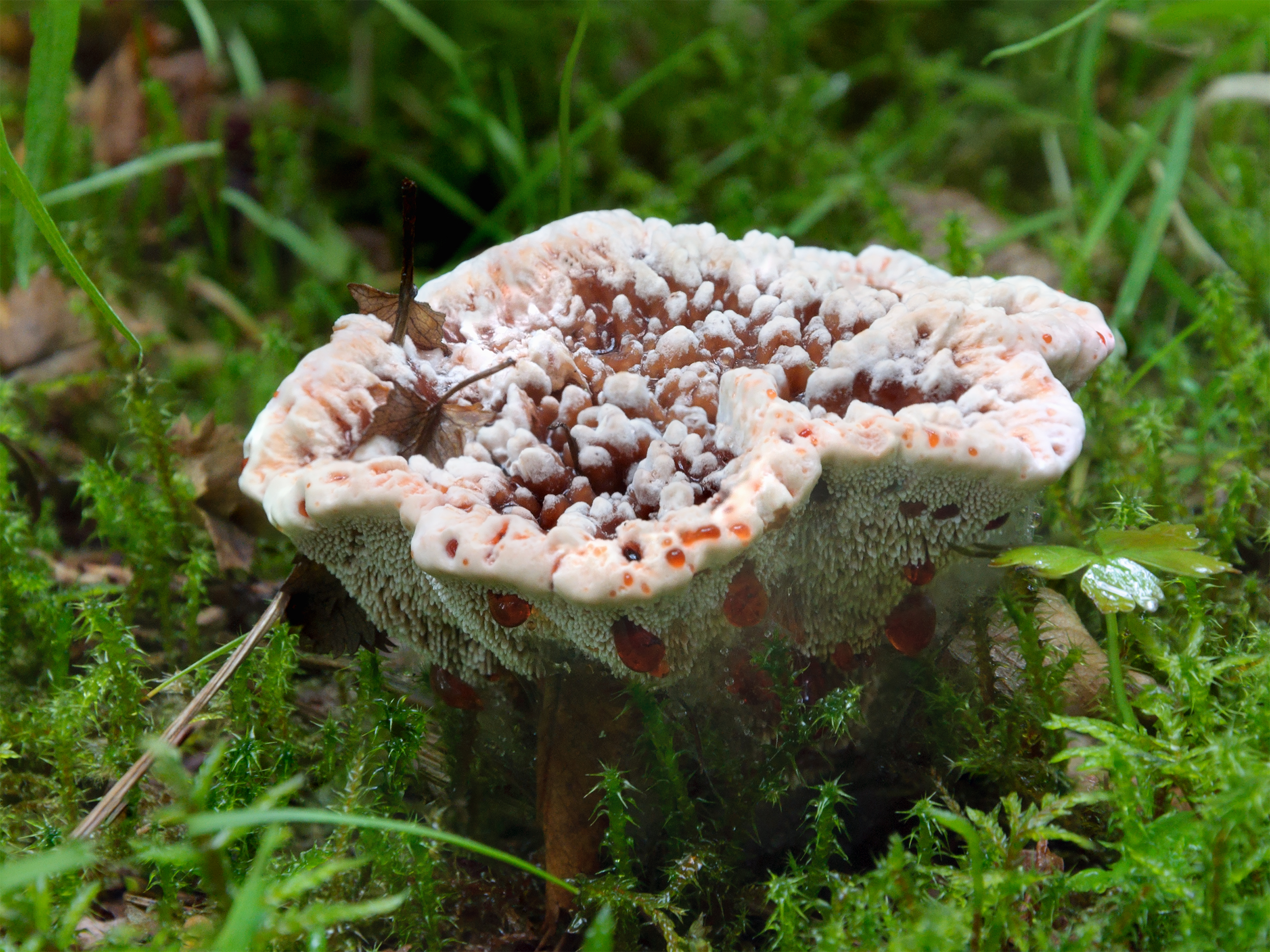

Scientific classification
- Domain: Eukaryota
- Kingdom: Fungi
- Division: Basidiomycota
- Class: Agaricomycetes
- Order: Thelephorales
- Family: Bankeraceae
- Genus: Hydnellum
- Species: H. ferrugineum

Binomial name
- Hydnellum ferrugineum (Fr.) P.Karst. (1879)

Synonyms
- Hydnum ferrugineum Fr. (1815); Hydnum carbunculus Secr. (1833); Calodon ferrugineus (Fr.) P.Karst. (1881); Phaeodon ferrugineus (Fr.) J.Schröt. (1888); Hydnellum sanguinarium Banker (1906); Calodon hybridus (Bull.) Lindau (1911); Hydnellum hybridum (Bull.) Banker (1913); Hydnellum pineticola K.A.Harrison (1964)

= Hydnellum ferrugineum =

Species of fungus

Hydnellum ferrugineum, commonly known as the mealy tooth or the reddish-brown corky spine fungus, is a species of tooth fungus in the family Bankeraceae. A widely distributed species, it is found in north Africa, Asia, Europe, and North America. The fungus fruits on the ground singly or in clusters in conifer forest, usually in poor (low nutrient) or sandy soil. Fruit bodies are somewhat top-shaped, measuring 3–10 cm (1–4 in) in diameter. Their velvety surfaces, initially white to pink, sometimes exude drops of red liquid. The lower surface of the fruit body features white to reddish-brown spines up to 6 mm long. Mature fruit bodies become dark reddish brown in color, and are then difficult to distinguish from other similar Hydnellum species. H. ferrugineum forms a mat of mycelia in the humus and upper soil where it grows. The presence of the fungus changes the characteristics of the soil, making it more podzolized.

== Taxonomy ==
The species was originally described scientifically by Elias Magnus Fries, who named it Hydnum ferrugineum in 1815. Its taxonomic history includes transfers to the genera Calodon by Petter Karsten in 1881, and Phaeodon by Joseph Schröter in 1888. It was assigned its current binomial name by Karsten when he transferred it to its current genus, Hydnellum, in 1879.

In 1964, Canadian mycologist Kenneth A. Harrison described a hydnoid fungus found with Pinus resinosa in Michigan and Pinus banksiana in Nova Scotia. The fungus, which Harrison named Hydnellum pineticola, is considered to be synonymous with Hydnellum ferrugineum by the nomenclatural database Index Fungorum. Harrison noted "The attempts to recognize European species in North American collections has only increased the confusion in this country, and until someone has worked critically in the field on both continents, it is better to make a recognizable grouping of our own population as that to guess that they may be the same as those that grow in Europe." Other taxa considered synonymous with H. ferrugineum are Pierre Bulliard's 1791 Hydnum hybridum (including later synonyms Calodon hybridus (Bull.) Lindau, and Hydnellum hybridum (Bull.) Banker); Louis Secretan's Hydnum carbunculus (1833); and Howard James Banker's 1906 Hydnellum sanguinarium. Banker explained the difficulty in identifying old Hydnellum specimens: "A considerable number of collections have had to be set aside, as in the dried state, with no notes on the fresh characters, it was impossible to decide with any degree of satisfaction whether the plants represented H. sanguinarium, H. concrescens, H. scrobiculatum, or some undescribed form."

Common names given to the species include the "reddish-brown corky spine fungus", and the British Mycological Society-sanctioned name "mealy fungus". The specific epithet ferrugineum is Latin for "rust-colored".

== Description ==
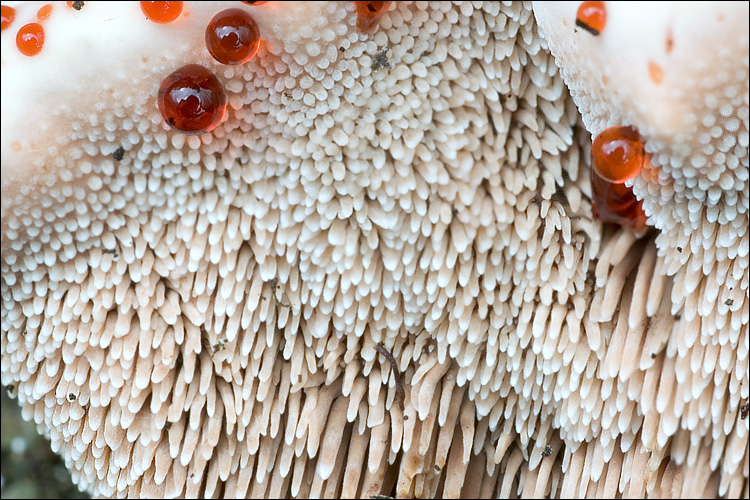
Closeup of hymenium showing the spines

The fruit bodies of Hydnellum ferrugineum are more or less top-shaped with caps that are 3–10 cm (1.2–3.9 in) in diameter. They are at first convex, then pulvinate (cushion-shaped), later flattening or becoming slightly depressed in the center. The cap surface of young fruit bodies is uneven, with a velvety to felted texture, and a whitish to pink color. It sometimes exudes blood-red drops of fluid in the depressions. The surface later becomes flesh-colored to dark reddish brown, but with wavy margin remaining whitish. The lower surface of the fruit body bears the hymenium, the fertile spore-bearing tissue. It comprises a dense arrangement of white to reddish brown spines up to 6 mm long, hanging vertically downwards. The stout stipe measures 1–6 cm (0.4–2.4 in) long by 1–3 cm (0.4–1.2 in) thick, and is the same color as the cap. Fruit bodies have a "distinctly mealy" odor (similar to the smell of freshly ground flour), but are inedible.

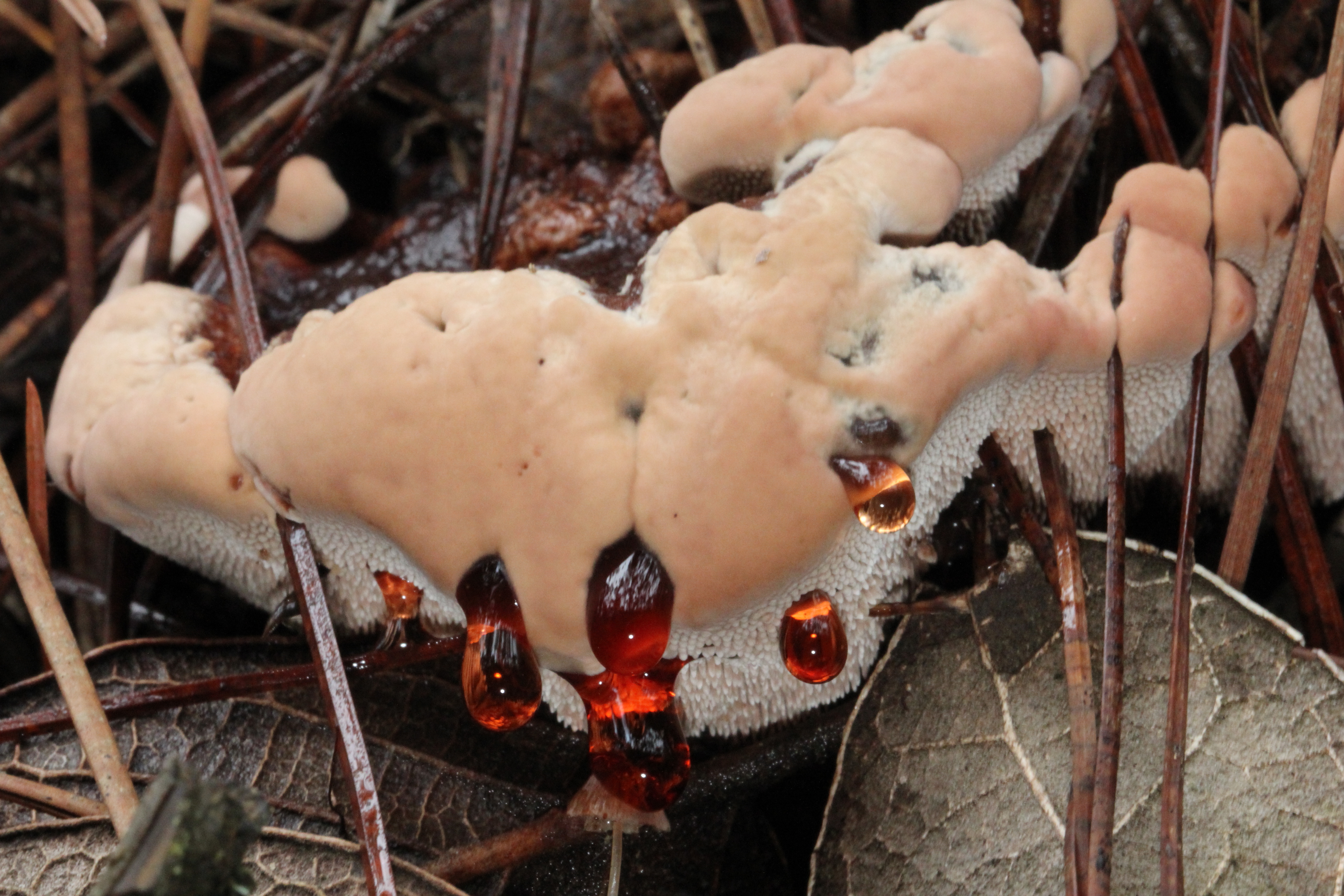
Fruit bodies can envelop obstacles as they grow.

The flesh is reddish or purplish-brown with white flecks. Initially spongy and soft, it becomes tough and corky as the fruit body matures. In the stipe, the flesh can become blackish in age. Like other Hydnellum species, fruit body tissue is made of generative hyphae that do not expand. This slows the growth of the fruit body, often enabling it to persist for several months. The fungus employs an indeterminate growth pattern, in which the fruit body formation begins from a vertical column of hyphae that eventually expand at the top to form the cap. Any solid objects encountered during growth, such as grass or twigs, can be enveloped by the expanding fruit body. Similarly, closely neighboring caps can fuse together during growth.

The broadly ellipsoid to roughly spherical spores are 5.5–7.5 by 4.5–5.5 μm. Their surfaces are covered with small rounded bumps. The basidia (spore-bearing cells) are narrowly club-shaped, four-spored, and measure 25–30 by 6–7.5 μm. The hyphae of the flesh are brownish with thin walls, and measure 4–6 μm; hyphae in the spines are thin-walled, septate, and sometimes branched, measuring 3.5–4.5 μm. The hyphae do not have clamp connections.

=== Similar species ===
Hydnellum peckii is similar in appearance, but has an acrid taste, and clamp connections in its hyphae. Hydnellum spongiosipes is readily confused with H. ferrugineum, and several authors have historically considered the two species to be the same; molecular studies, however, indicate that the two fungi are closely related, but distinct. In contrast with H. ferrugineum, H. spongiosipes has a darker cap when young, darker flesh, and occurs in deciduous woods. Old fruit bodies of H. ferrugineum can be confused with those of Hydnellum concrescens.

== Habitat and distribution ==
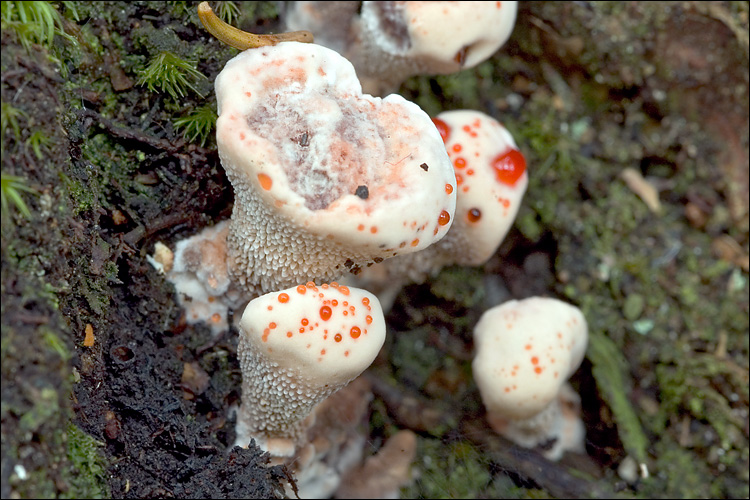
Young fruit bodies

Hydnellum ferrugineum is found mainly in coniferous woodland, often near pines, but occasionally with spruce. Fruit bodies have a preference for sandy soil with low levels of organic matter and nutrients, and grow singly or in clusters. They are more likely to be found in older-growth forests. The fungus occurs in North America, including Mexico. It is widespread but generally uncommon throughout Europe, although there may be local areas where it is common. In Britain, H. ferrugineum is provisionally classified as endangered, and is protected under the Wildlife and Countryside Act 1981; it was included as one of 14 species considered in the United Kingdom Biodiversity Action Plan for stipitate hydnoid fungi (i.e., hydnoid fungi with a cap and stipe) in 2004. The fungus is protected in Montenegro. It has been collected in India and North Africa.

The fungus forms a tough mat of mycelia in the humus and upper soil of pine forests. This mycelial mat grows larger with old trees, and can cover an area of several square meters. These areas generally lack dwarf shrubs and promote the vigorous growth of mosses; reindeer lichens often occur in the center of large mats. The presence of the fungus changes the nature of the soil, resulting in a thinner humus layer, decreased groundwater penetration, decreased soil pH, and increases in the level of root respiration as well as the quantity of roots. The fungus also decreases the organic carbon and nitrogen concentrations. Soil with the mycelium becomes more podzolized than the surrounding soil. Similar to some other Hydnellum species, H. ferrugineum is sensitive to the increased nitrogen deposition resulting from clear-cutting, a forestry practice used in some areas of Europe. The fungus forms an unusual type of mycorrhiza with Scots pine (Pinus sylvestris) in which the ectomycorrhiza appears normal at the leading edge of the mycelial mat, but leaves behind dead and atrophied roots at the trailing edge, showing saprophytic tendencies.

== Bioactive compounds ==
Hydnellum ferrugineum fruit bodies contain the pigments hydnuferrigin (dark violet) and hydnuferruginin (yellow), as well as small amounts of the polyphenol compound atromentin. Hydnuferrigin has a chemical structure that closely resembles that of thelephoric acid, a pigment found in other species of Hydnellum and Hydnum, and they may originate from a common precursor compound.
