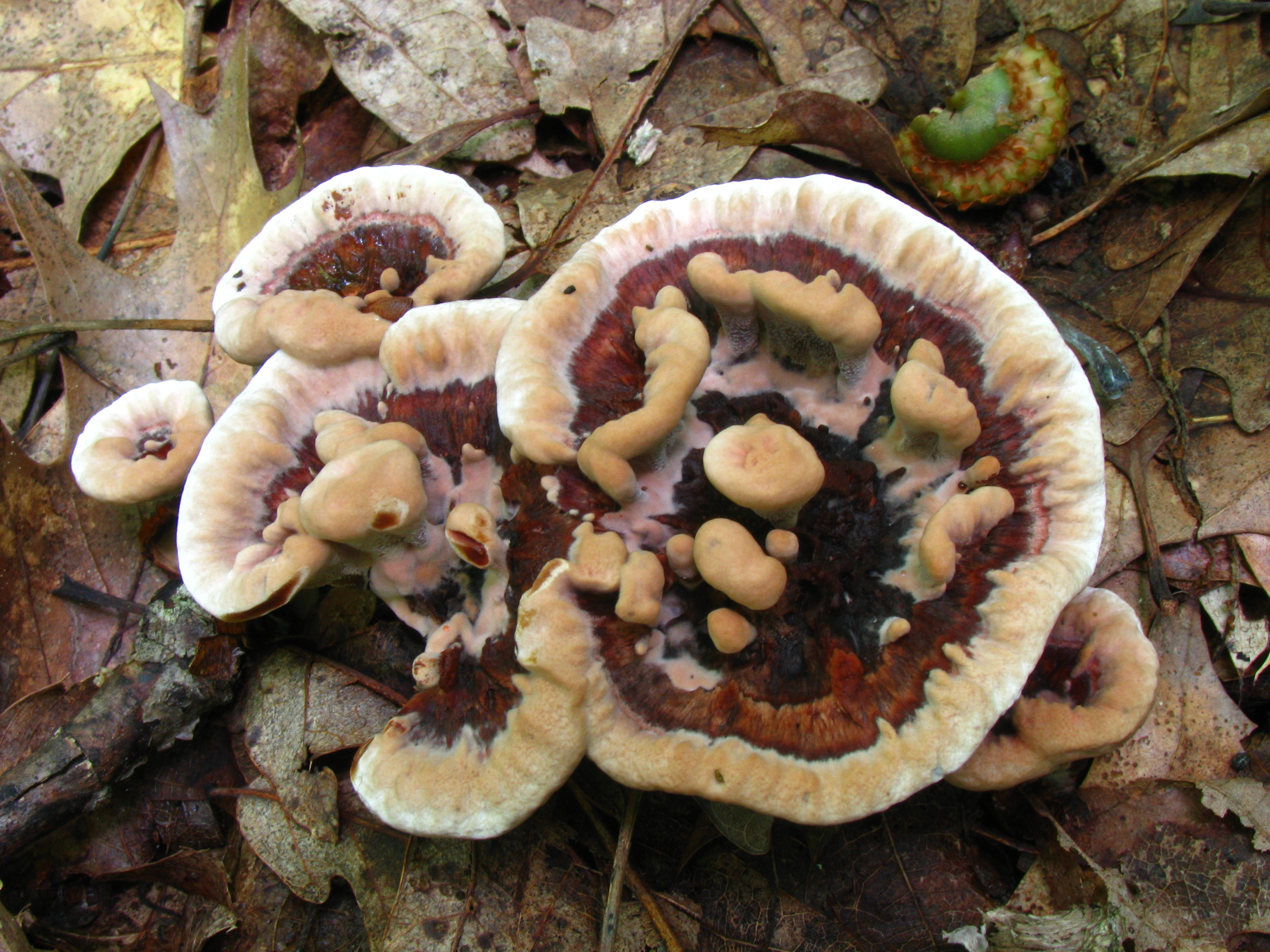

Scientific classification
- Kingdom: Fungi
- Division: Basidiomycota
- Class: Agaricomycetes
- Order: Thelephorales
- Family: Bankeraceae
- Genus: Hydnellum
- Species: H. scrobiculatum

Binomial name
- Hydnellum scrobiculatum (Fr.) P.Karst. (1879)

Synonyms
- Hydnum scrobiculatum Fr. (1815); Calodon scrobiculatus (Fr.) P.Karst. (1882); Hydnum sanguineofulvum Britzelm. (1891); Hydnum ferrugineoalbum Britzelm. (1894); Hydnum testaceofulvum Britzelm. (1894); Phaeodon scrobiculatus (Fr.) Henn. (1898); Hydnellum velutinum var. scrobiculatum (Fr.) Maas Geest. (1957)

= Hydnellum scrobiculatum =

Species of fungus

Hydnellum scrobiculatum
- Mycological characteristics
- Teeth on hymenium
- Cap is flat or depressed
- Stipe is bare
- Ecology is mycorrhizal
- Edibility is inedible

Hydnellum scrobiculatum, commonly known as the rough hydnellum or ridged tooth, is a tooth fungus in the family Bankeraceae. Widely distributed in the Northern Hemisphere, it is found in Eurasia and North America.

== Taxonomy ==
The fungus was first described as a species of Hydnum by Elias Magnus Fries in his 1815 work Observationes mycologicae. Petter Karsten transferred it to the genus Hydnellum in 1879. Canadian mycologist Kenneth A. Harrison published the variety H. scrobiculatum var. zonatum as a new combination in 1961, but this is now considered to be synonymous with Hydnellum concrescens. Common names given to the species include "pitted corky spine fungus", and the British Mycological Society recommended name "ridged tooth".

== Description ==
The fruitbodies have centrally depressed caps measuring 2–6 cm (0.8–2.4 in) in diameter. These caps can fuse together to form concrescent fruitbodies. The caps have wavy edges, and an initially felty surface that becomes scaly with age. Young fruit bodies are white, then pinkish-brown, then purplish brown, sometimes with white margins. The fruitbodies can become shiny in age.

The spines on the cap underside are up to 4 mm long. They are initially white, but become purplish brown in maturity. The spines are decurrent—they run down the length of the stipe. The stipe, which is roughly the same color as the cap, measures 2–3 cm (0.8–1.2 in) long by 1–1.5 cm (0.4–0.6 in) thick. Mycelium at the base of the stipe envelops and grows around forest litter. The flesh smells mealy (similar to freshly ground flour). The edibility of the fruitbody was previously unknown, but Roger Phillips calls it "poor". In general, Hydnellum species are too acrid and woody to be palatable.

Like all Hydnellum species, H. scrobiculatum produces a brown spore print. Individual spores have a more or less spherical shape, with dimensions of 5.5–6.5 by 4–5.6 μm. They have wart-like projections (tubercles) on the surface. The basidia (spore-bearing cells) are narrowly club-shaped, four-spored, and measure 23–29 by 5–6.5 μm.

=== Similar species ===
There are several species that Hydnellum scrobiculatum is often confused with—especially older specimens. These include H. spongiosipes, H. ferrugineum, and H. concrescens. The latter species is particularly similar to H. scrobiculatum, a fact that has been highlighted by conservation efforts in the UK.

== Habitat and distribution ==
Hydnellum scrobiculatum fruits singly, in clusters, or in fused groups in both coniferous and mixed forests. It is found in Europe, Asia, and North America. In the United Kingdom, it is considered vulnerable according to the biodiversity action plan for stiped hydnoid fungi.
