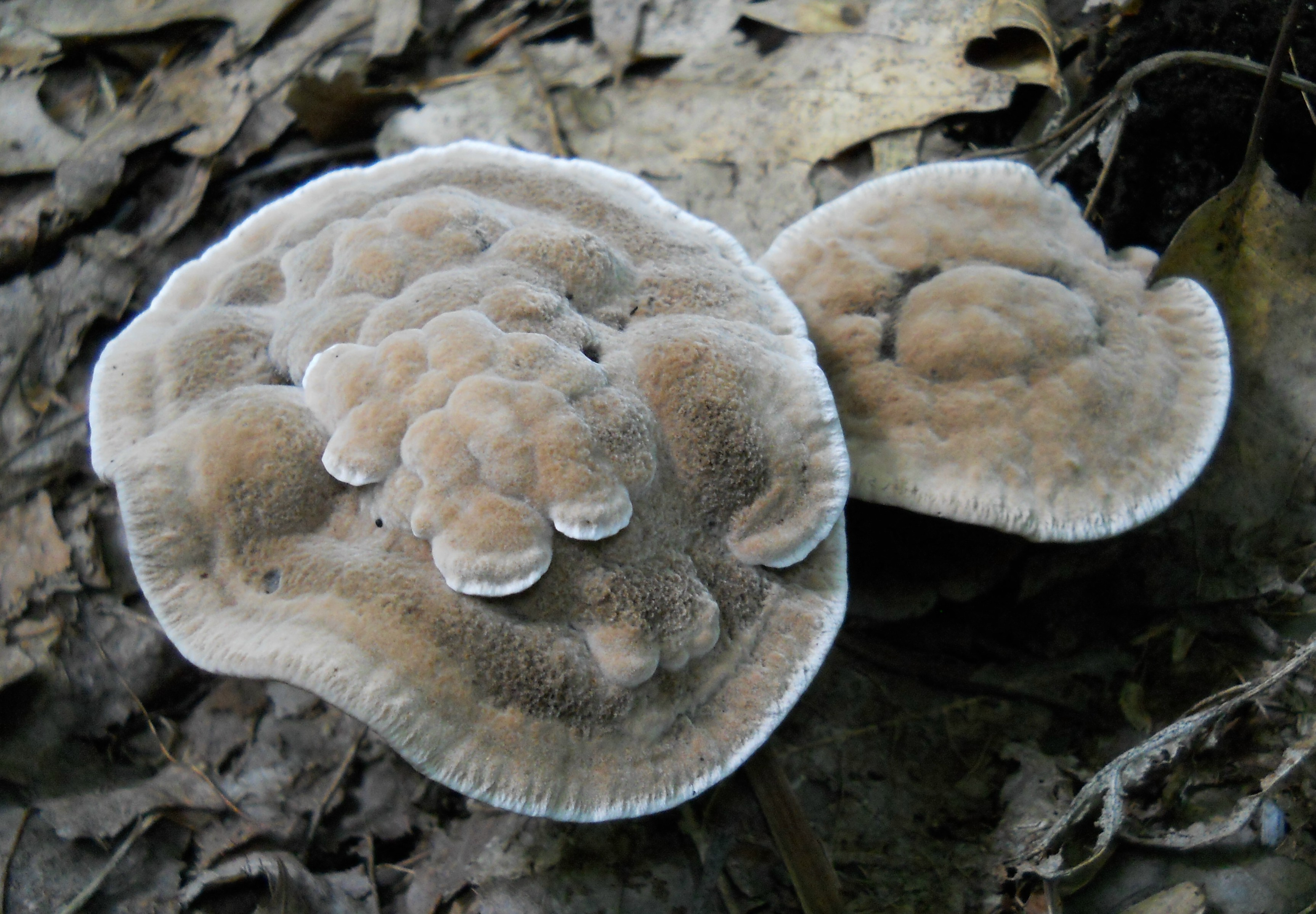

Scientific classification
- Kingdom: Fungi
- Division: Basidiomycota
- Class: Agaricomycetes
- Order: Thelephorales
- Family: Bankeraceae
- Genus: Hydnellum
- Species: H. spongiosipes

Binomial name
- Hydnellum spongiosipes (Peck) Pouzar (1960)

Synonyms
- Hydnum spongiosipes Peck (1898); Hydnellum nuttallii Banker (1906); Hydnum nuttallii (Banker) Sacc. & Trotter (1912); Hydnellum velutinum var. spongiosipes (Peck) Maas Geest. (1957)

= Hydnellum spongiosipes =

Species of fungus

Hydnellum spongiosipes, commonly known as the velvet tooth, is a tooth fungus in the family Bankeraceae. It is found in Europe and North America. In Switzerland, it is considered a vulnerable species.

== Taxonomy ==
The fungus was originally described as new to science in 1898 by American mycologist Charles Horton Peck, who placed it in the genus Hydnum. Zdeněk Pouzar transferred it to Hydnellum in 1960. Synonyms include Hydnellum nuttallii, published by Howard James Banker in 1906, and Hydnellum velutinum var. spongiosipes, published by Rudolph Arnold Maas Geesteranus in 1957.

== Description ==
The cap is up to 8 centimetres (3 1/4 in) wide. The flesh is light brown on the outside and darker within. The spore print is brown.

=== Similar species ===
Lookalikes include H. concrescens, H. ferrugineum, and H. scrobiculatum.

== Distribution ==
It is found in Europe and North America. In the latter, it appears in the east from July to September.
