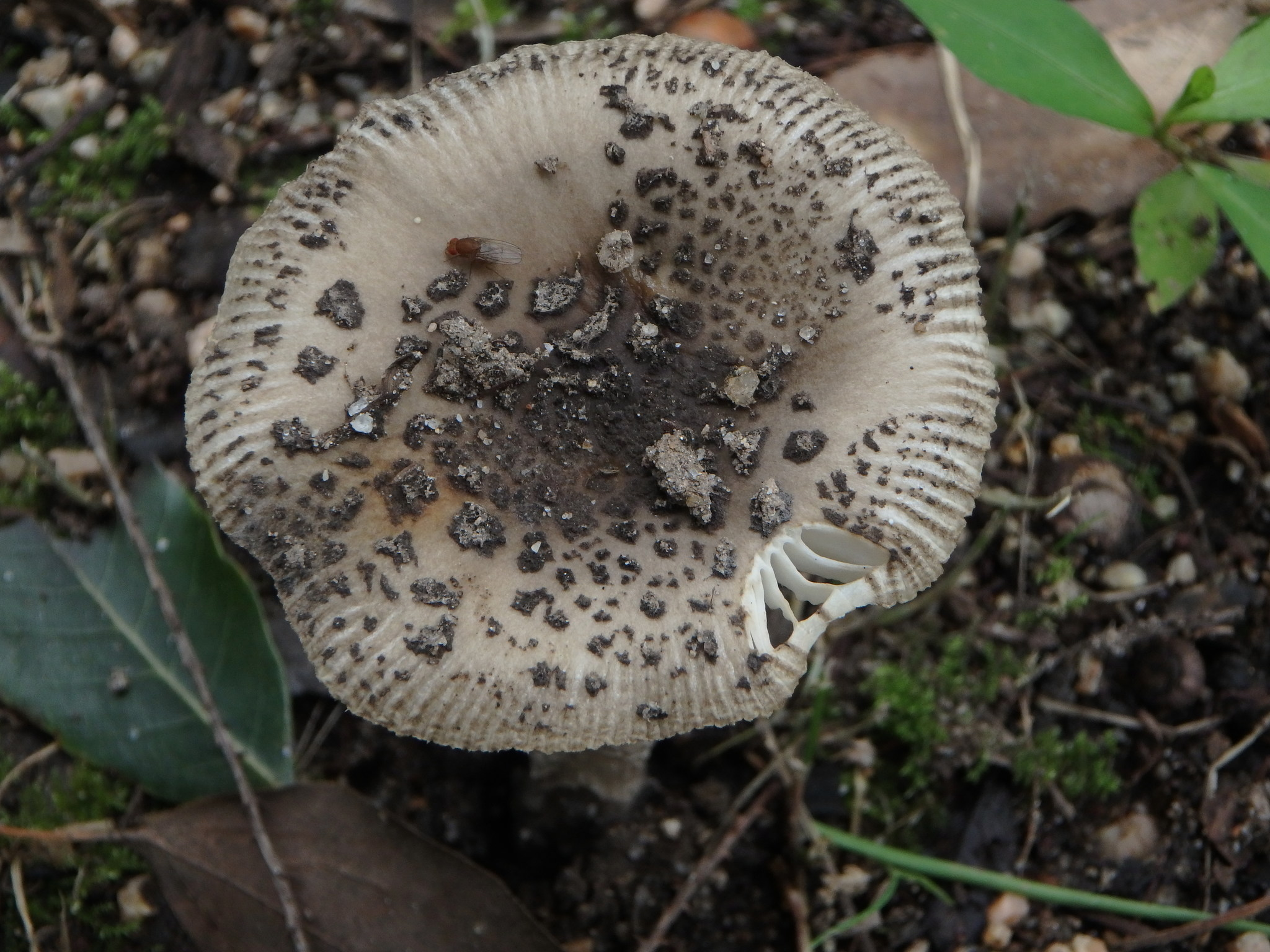

Scientific classification
- Domain: Eukaryota
- Kingdom: Fungi
- Division: Basidiomycota
- Class: Agaricomycetes
- Order: Agaricales
- Family: Amanitaceae
- Genus: Amanita
- Species: A. liquii

Binomial name
- Amanita liquii Yang Weiß & Oberwinkler, 2004

= Amanita liquii =

Species of fungus

Amanita liquii Mycological characteristics
- Gills on hymenium
- Cap is convex
- Hymenium is free
- Stipe has a volva
- Spore print is white
- Ecology is mycorrhizal
- Edibility is unknown

Amanita liquii, also known as the dark-faced ringless amanita, is a species of agaric that fruits from July to September.

This large and robust agaric (cap diameter up to 14 centimetres or 5 1/2 inches, stem length up to 17 cm) is distinguishable by its very dark, sometimes almost black, overall colour. The scientific name is taken from the Chinese hero Li Kui (sometimes spelled Li Qui), who had a dark face.

It is associated with firs and pines in south-western China up to an altitude of 4,000 metres.
