= Pacific Southwest =

Region of the United States

- Region
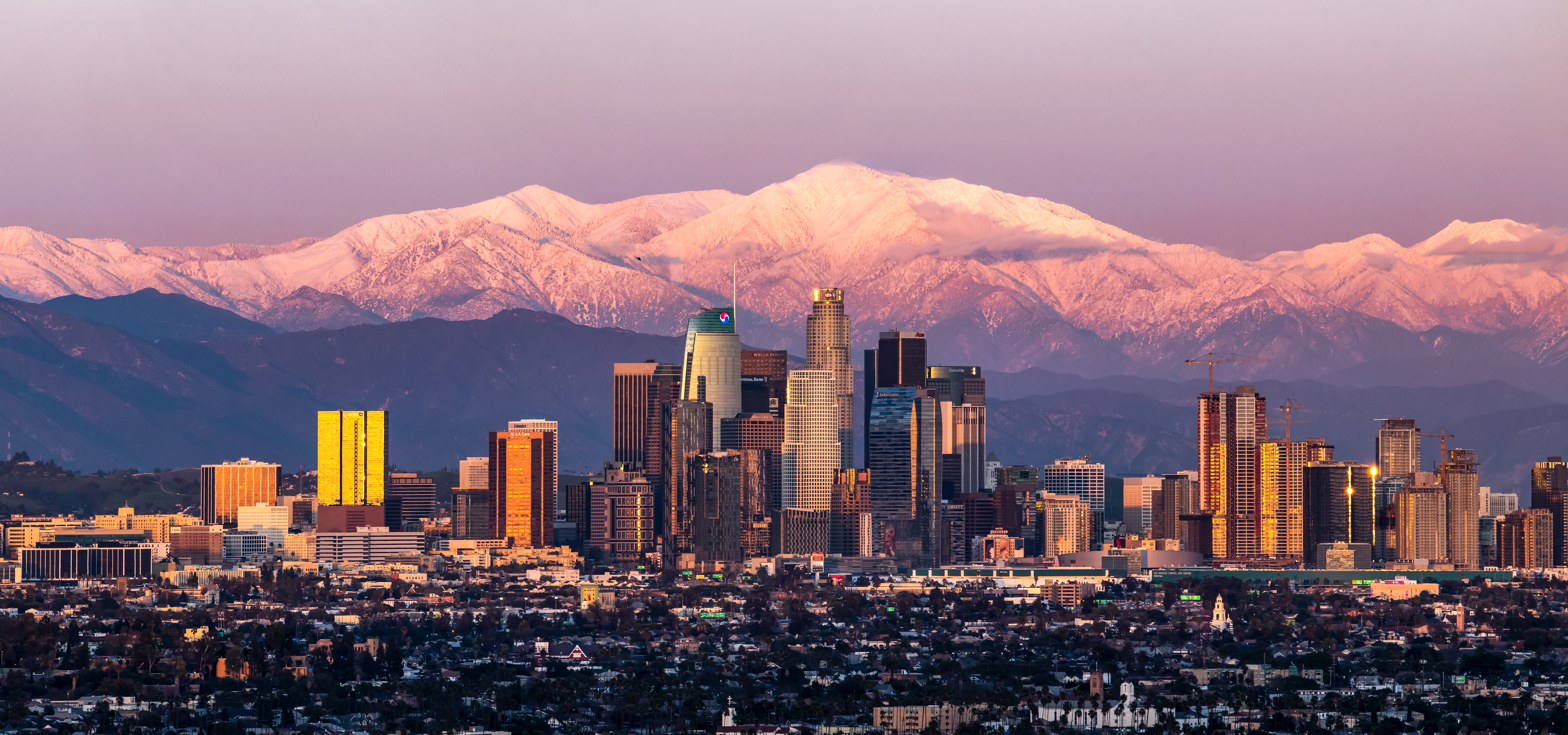
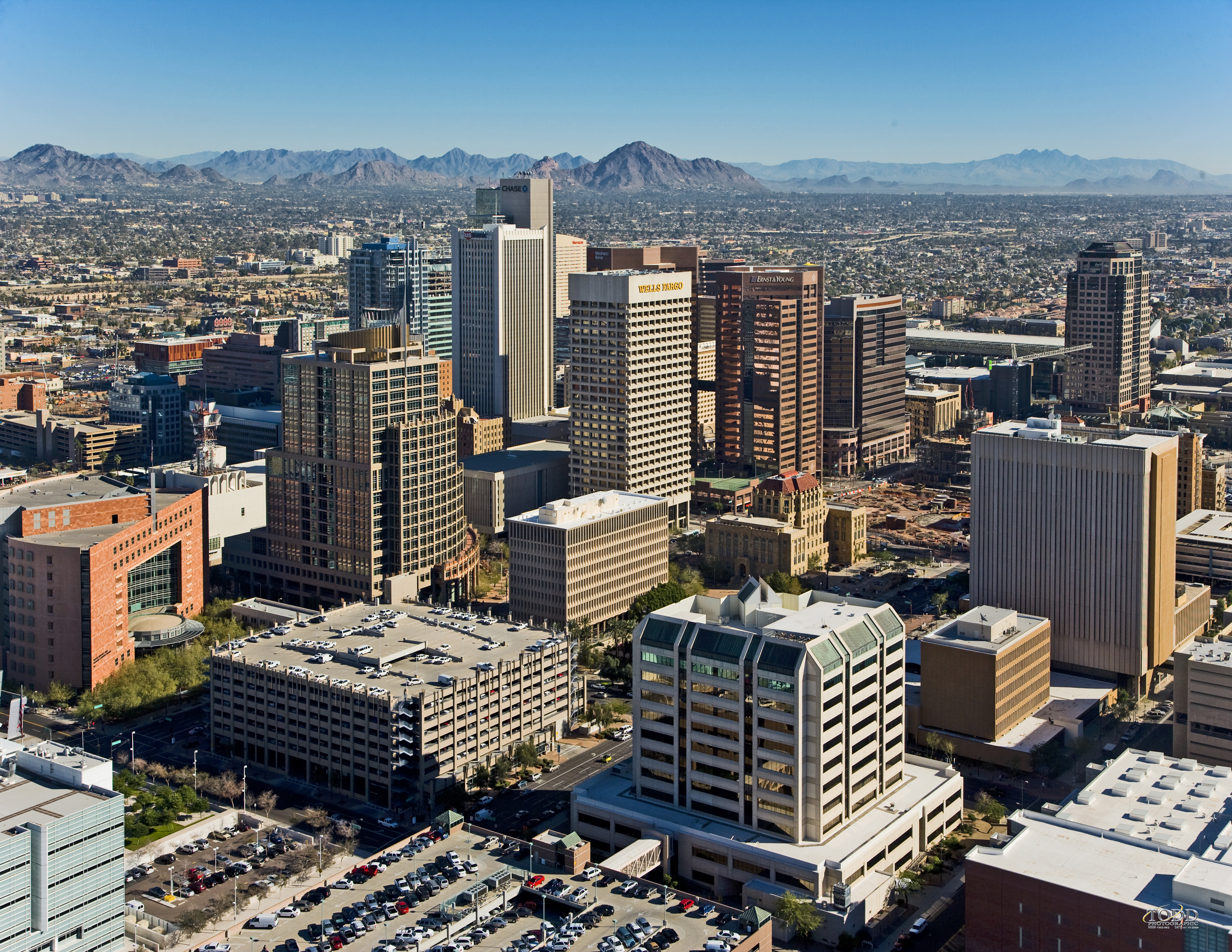
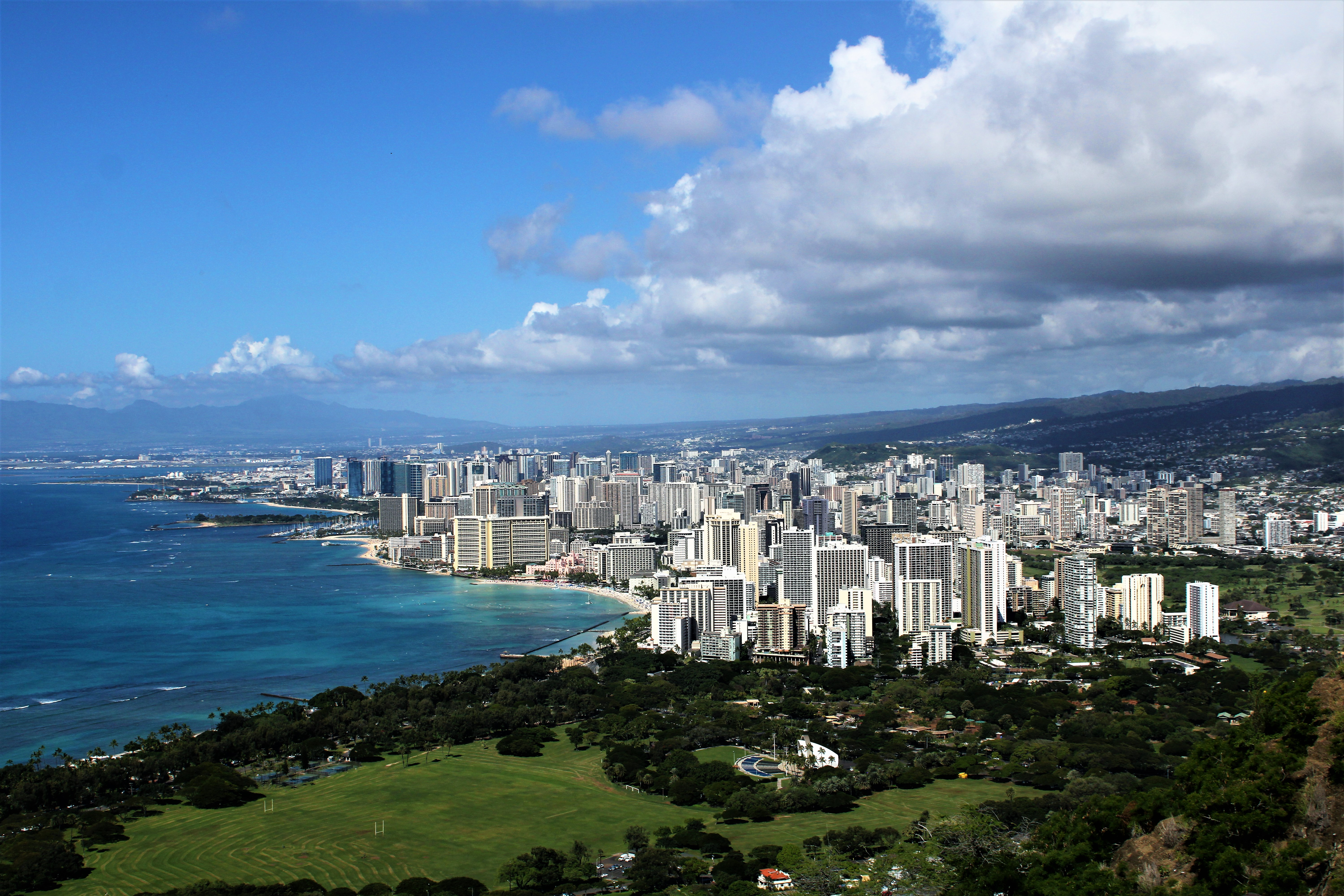
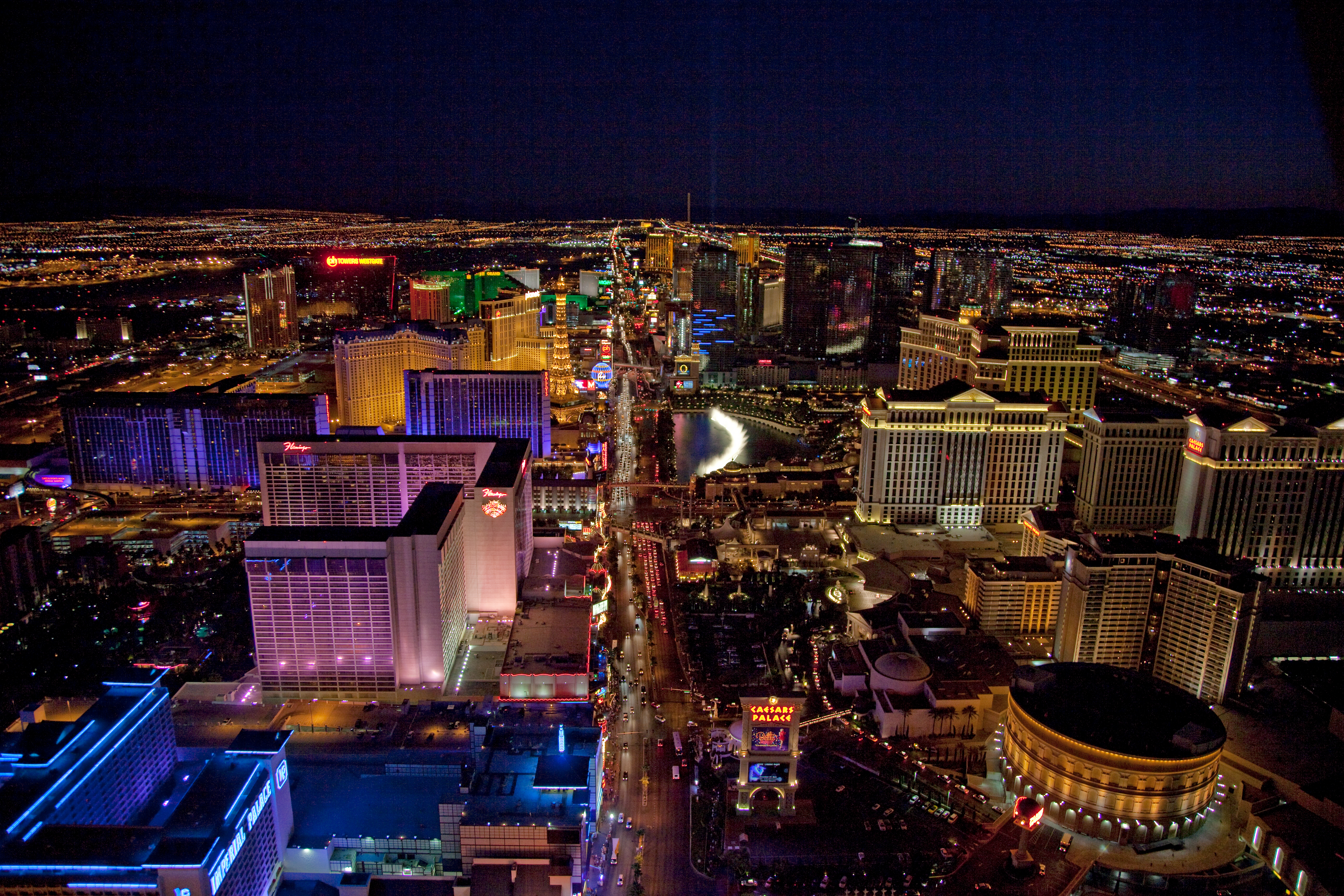
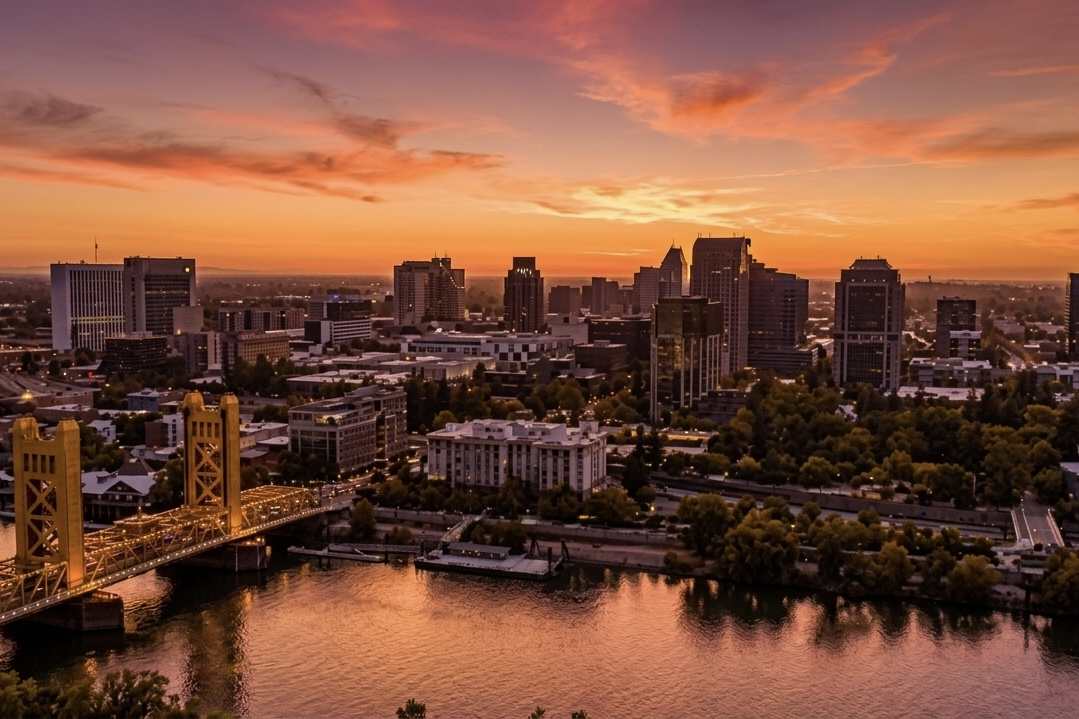
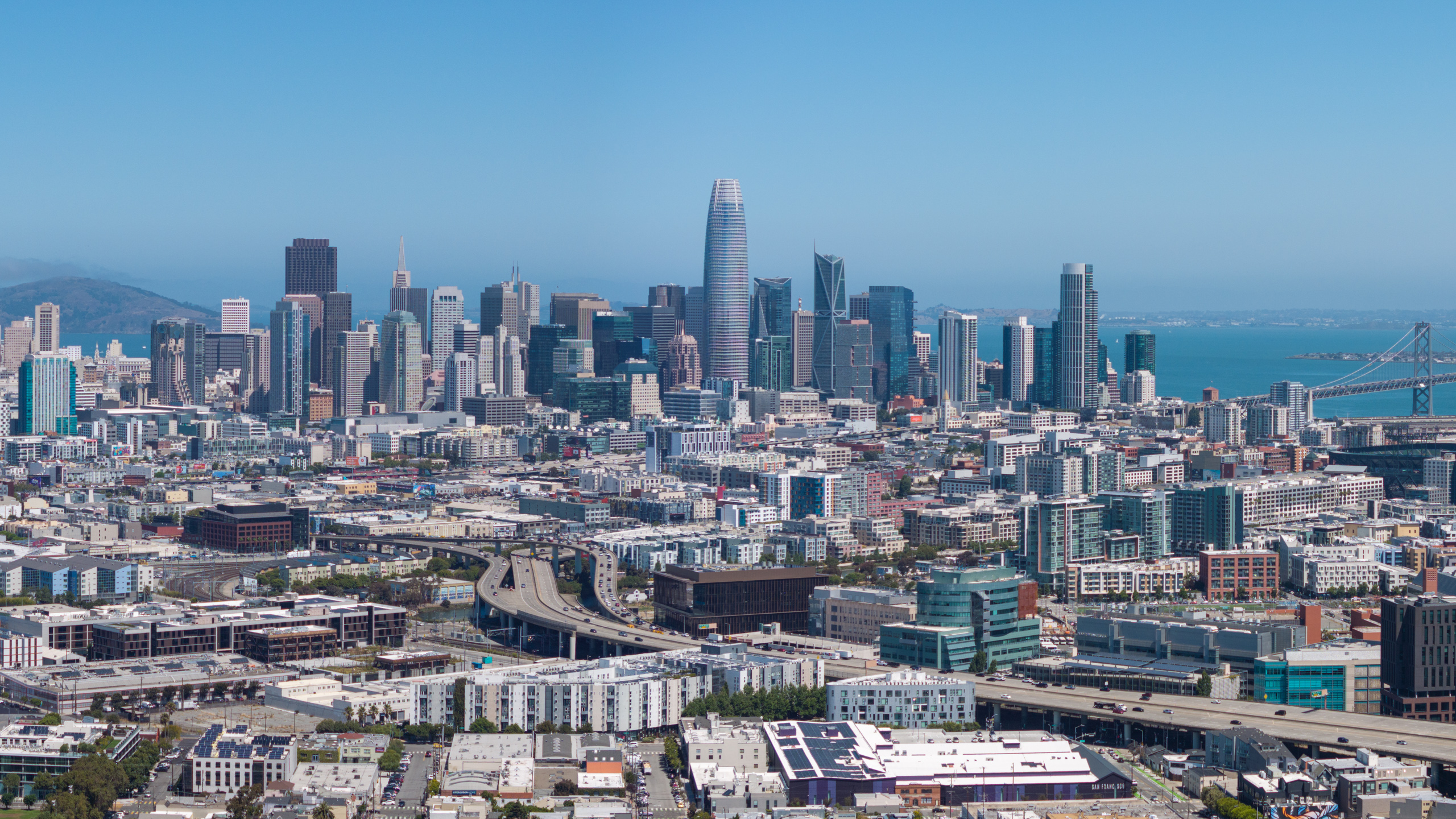
- From top: Los Angeles skyline and Mount Baldy at sunset, Phoenix skyline with Sonoran Desert, Honolulu skyline and Pacific Ocean, Las Vegas Strip, Sacramento skyline with the Sacramento River and Mount Diablo in the distance, San Francisco on a clear day with the San Francisco Bay

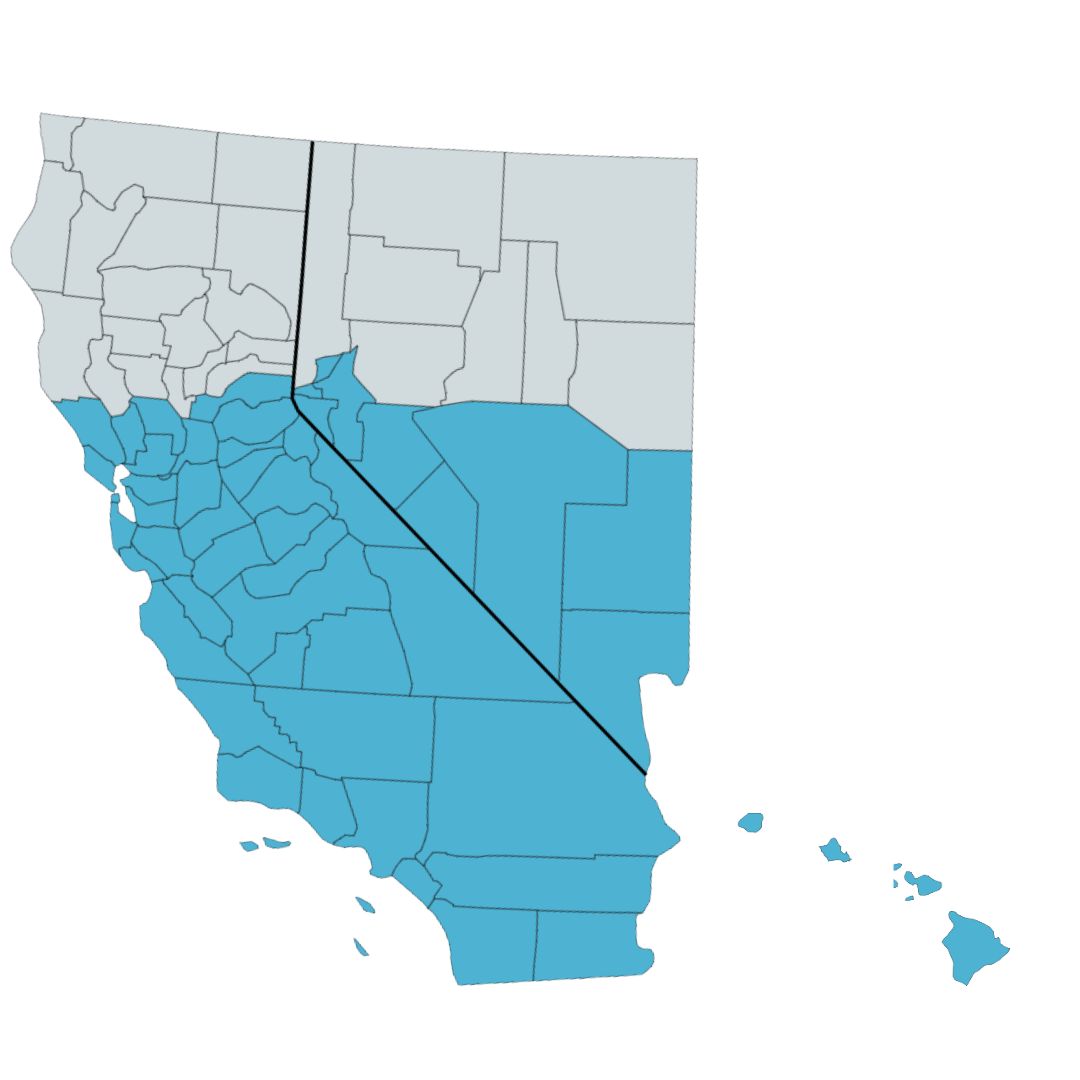
- A map of the United States Pacific Southwest Region
- Largest metropolitan areas: Los Angeles; San Francisco; Sacramento; Las Vegas; San Diego
- Largest city: Los Angeles; San Diego; San Jose; San Francisco; Las Vegas; Sacramento; Fresno
- Dialect: American English

The Pacific Southwest (Spanish: Suroeste del Pacífico) is a region of the United States. In its broadest definition, it encompasses three states: Hawaii, California, and Nevada. The region is one of cultural diversity seen all over. Several major urban areas lie within the region.

== Definition ==
There is no universal border of the Pacific Southwest for example, the American Society for Photogrammetry and Remote Sensing has a geographical application of the term, defining it as California, Arizona, Nevada and Hawaii. The Fish and Wildlife Service, on the other hand, uses an ecological approach to define it as California, Nevada, and the Klamath Basin (which includes parts of Oregon).

Ambiguity regarding the term is further compounded by the fact that even several United States federal agencies use different definitions. In addition to the Fish and Wildlife Service mentioned above, the Environmental Protection Agency defines Pacific Southwest as California, Nevada, Arizona and Hawaii, and the Forest Service defines it as California, Hawaii, and other U.S. islands in the Pacific Ocean.

== Culture ==
Cultures combine and collaborate in the Pacific Southwest. Traces of the Old American West can still be seen in some areas, especially in the deserts. Hip-hop is one of the many cultures prevalent here, most noticeable in Los Angeles. Polynesian culture flourishes in Hawaii, and Hawaiian Pidgin can still be heard in certain areas of the state. Spanish/Mexican culture is the most visible in the region, due to four of the five states having once been Spanish/Mexican possessions. Cowboys in the vaquero traditions of northern Mexico can be found in the Pacific Southwest, though less along the Pacific coast. Hawaii has its own version of the American cowboy, the paniolo. Asian culture is demonstrated in the region, especially in California and Hawaii.

== Geography ==
The Pacific Southwest contains a vast diversity in environments. Sub-arctic conditions are common in the high mountains of the region, such as in the Sierra Nevada and on Mauna Kea. California, Nevada, and Arizona contain significant deserts, both hot and cold type. California is characterized primarily by hot summer and warm summer Mediterranean climates, in addition to 33 million acres of forests. Rainforests, both temperate and tropical, exist along some of the northern coast of California, as well as in certain areas of Hawaii. Hawaii has an array of tropical ecologies.
