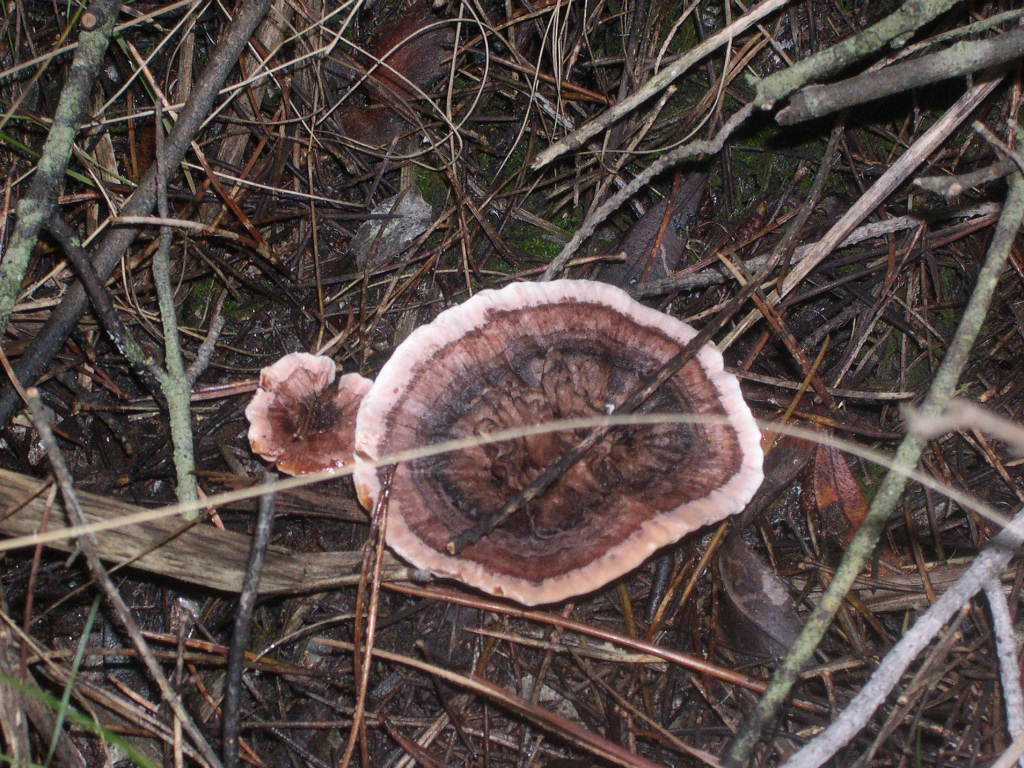

Scientific classification
- Kingdom: Fungi
- Division: Basidiomycota
- Class: Agaricomycetes
- Order: Thelephorales
- Family: Bankeraceae
- Genus: Hydnellum
- Species: H. concrescens

Binomial name
- Hydnellum concrescens (Pers.) Banker (1906)

Synonyms
- Hydnum concrescens Pers. (1796)

= Hydnellum concrescens =

Species of fungus

Hydnellum concrescens is an inedible fungus, commonly known as the zoned hydnellum or zoned tooth fungus. As with other tooth fungi, the spores are produced on spines on the underside of the cap, rather than gills. It has a funnel-shaped cap, typically between 2 and 7 cm (0.79 and 2.76 in) in diameter, which has characteristic concentric zones of color. The cap may also have radial ridges extending from the center to the margins. The spines are pink in young specimens, but turn brown with age.

This species is very similar in appearance to Hydnellum scrobiculatum, and traditionally, largely unreliable microscopic characteristics such as spore size and ornamentation have been used to distinguish between the two. Recent research has demonstrated a way to discriminate the two species using DNA sequencing of the ITS regions.

== See also ==
- Hydnellum scrobiculatum
- Tooth fungi
- Hydnellum
- DNA barcoding
