= Louis Secretan =

Swiss lawyer and mycologist

Louis (Gabriel Abraam Samuel Jean) Secretan (15 September 1758 – 24 May 1839) was a Swiss lawyer, politician and mycologist. He published Mycologie Suisse in 1833, though the names are not regarded as valid unless republished by other authors. He was a member of the Swiss Academy of Sciences. The standard author abbreviation Secr. is used to indicate this person as the author when citing a botanical name.

== Early life and career ==
Secretan was born on 15 September 1758 in Lausanne to Pierre-Isaac Secretan, a lawyer, and Louise Rolaz du Rosey. He studied Law in Lausanne and at the University of Tübingen, where he received a doctorate in 1780, becoming a lawyer in 1782. Among his clients were Jacques Necker, Germaine de Staël and Benjamin Constant.

== Political career ==
Secretan began his political career as a member of the Council of Two Hundred of Lausanne. He later held a position in the government of the Helvetic Republic (1798-1803), supporting a unitary state and Jewish emancipation. After the end of the Republic, Secretan held various political and judicial offices in the new canton of Vaud and its capital, Lausanne. He was appointed member of the commission charged with drafting the Federal Treaty, the new Swiss constitution, in 1814. He served as a member of the Grand Council of Vaud from 1803 until his death on 24 May 1839, in Lausanne.
