= List of bioluminescent fungi =

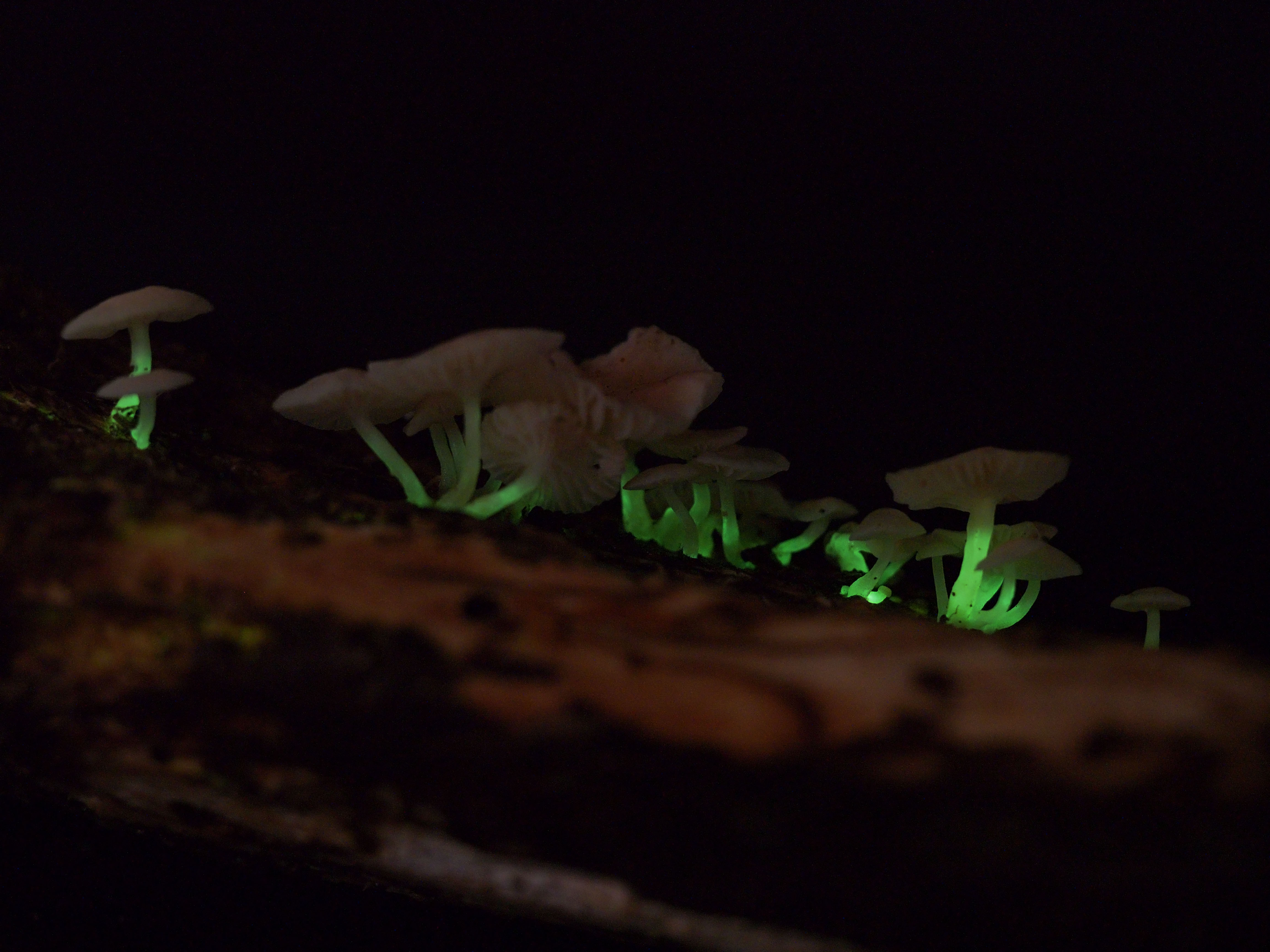
Bioluminescent Mycena roseoflava

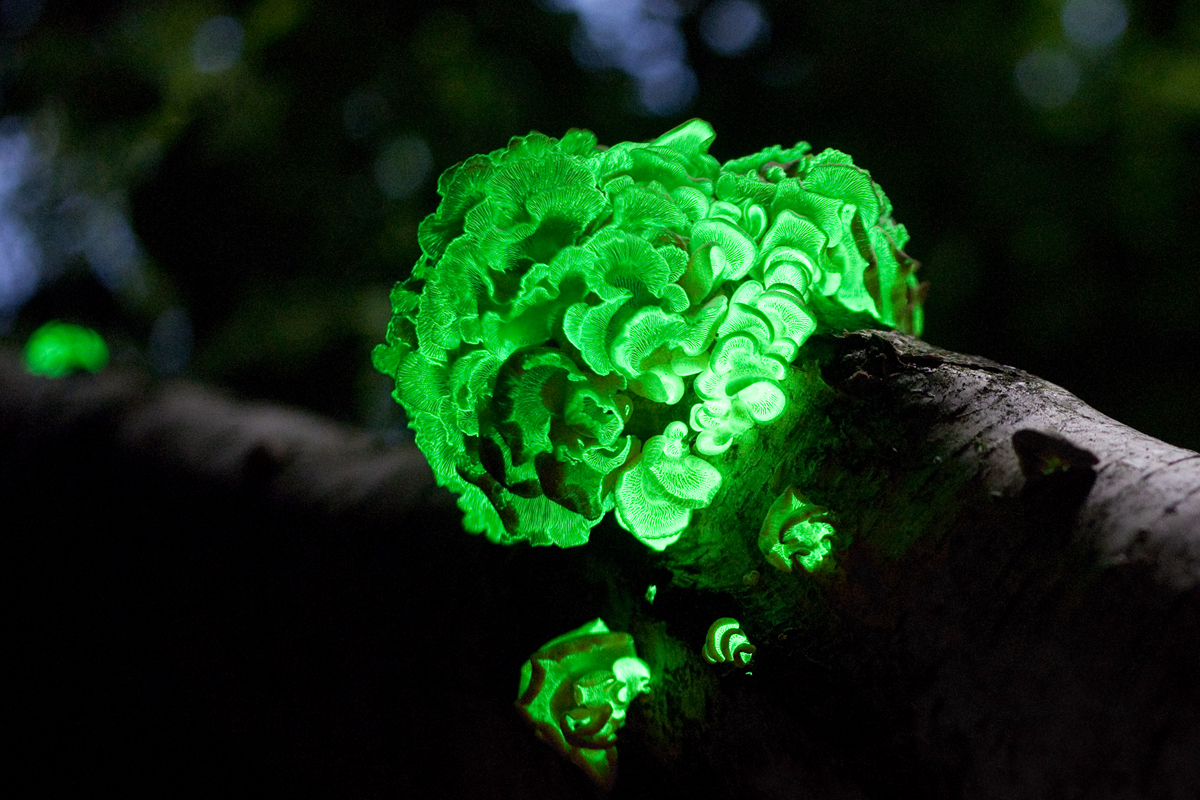
Panellus stipticus is among about 125 known species of bioluminescent fungi.

This list of bioluminescent fungi has more than 125 known species found largely in temperate and tropical climates. They are members of the order Agaricales (Basidiomycota) with one possible exceptional ascomycete belonging to the order Xylariales. All known bioluminescent Agaricales are mushroom-forming, white-spored agarics that belong to four distinct evolutionary lineages. The Omphalotus lineage (comprising the genera Omphalotus and Neonothopanus) contains 12 species, the Armillaria lineage has 10 known species, while the Mycenoid lineage (Favolachia, Mycena, Panellus, Prunulus, Roridomyces) has more than 50 species. The recently discovered Lucentipes lineage contains two species, Mycena lucentipes and Gerronema viridilucens, which belong to a family that has not yet been formally named. Armillaria mellea is the most widely distributed of the luminescent fungi, found across Asia, Europe, North America, and South Africa.

The newly discovered Eoscyphella lineage, represented by Eoscyphella luciurceolata from the Atlantic Rainforest in southern Brazil, marks a significant expansion in understanding of fungal bioluminescence.

Bioluminescent fungi emit a greenish light at a wavelength of 520–530 nm. The light emission is continuous and occurs only in living cells. No correlation of fungal bioluminescence with cell structure has been found. Bioluminescence may occur in both mycelia and fruit bodies, as in Panellus stipticus and Omphalotus olearius, or only in mycelia and young rhizomorphs, as in Armillaria mellea. In Roridomyces roridus luminescence occurs only in the spores, while in Collybia tuberosa, it is only in the sclerotia.

Although the biochemistry of fungal bioluminescence has not fully been characterized, the preparation of bioluminescent, cell-free extracts has allowed researchers to characterize the in vitro requirements of fungal bioluminescence. Experimental data suggest that a two-stage mechanism is required. In the first, a light-emitting substance (called "luciferin") is reduced by a soluble reductase enzyme at the expense of NAD(P)H. In the second stage, reduced luciferin is oxidized by an insoluble luciferase that releases the energy in the form of bluish-green light. Conditions that affect the growth of fungi, such as pH, light and temperature, have been found to influence bioluminescence, suggesting a link between metabolic activity and fungal bioluminescence.

All bioluminescent fungi share the same enzymatic mechanism, suggesting that there is a bioluminescent pathway that arose early in the evolution of the mushroom-forming Agaricales. All known luminescent species are white rot fungi capable of breaking down lignin, found in abundance in wood. Bioluminescence is an oxygen-dependent metabolic process and therefore may provide antioxidant protection against the potentially damaging effects of reactive oxygen species produced during wood decay.

The physiological and ecological function of fungal bioluminescence has not been established with certainty. It has been suggested that in the dark beneath closed tropical forest canopies, bioluminescent fruit bodies may be at an advantage by attracting grazing animals (including insects and other arthropods) that could help disperse their spores. Conversely, where mycelium (and vegetative structures like rhizomorphs and sclerotia) are the bioluminescent tissues, the argument has been made that light emission could deter grazing.

The following list of bioluminescent mushrooms is based on a 2008 literature survey by Dennis Desjardin and colleagues, in addition to accounts of several new species published since then.

== Species ==
Binomial	Luminescence		Distribution	References
Binomial	Mycelium	Fruit body	Distribution	References
Armillaria calvescens Bérubé & Dessur.	Yes	Yes	Eastern NA	
Armillaria cepistipes Velen.	Yes	?	NA, Eurasia	
Armillaria fuscipes Petch	Yes	No	Malaysia, Africa	
Armillaria gallica Marxm. & Romagn.	Yes	No	EU, NA, Africa, Japan	
Armillaria gemina Bérubé & Dessur.	Yes	?	Eastern NA	
Armillaria limonea (G.Stev.) Boesew.	No	Yes	Australasia, SA	
Armillaria mellea (Valh.) P.Kumm.	Yes	No	Eurasia, NA	
Armillaria nabsnona T.J. Volk & Burds.	Yes	?	Western NA, Asia	
Armillaria novae-zelandiae (G.Stev.) Boesew.	Yes	Yes	NZ, Australia, New Guinea, SA	
Armillaria ostoyae (Romagn.) Henrik	Yes	No	EU, NA	
Armillaria sinapina Bérubé & Dessur.	Yes	?	NA, Asia	
Armillaria tabescens (Scop.) Emel	Yes	No	EU, NA	
Collybia tuberosa (Bull.) P. Kumm	No	Only sclerotia	EU, NA, Lithuania	
Cruentomycena orientalis Har. Takah., Taneyama & Hadano	Yes	Yes	Japan, Taiwan	
Cruentomycena viscidocruenta (Cleland) R.H. Petersen & Kovalenko 2008	Yes	No	New Zealand	
Desarmillaria ectypa (Fr.) R.A. Koch & Aime	Yes	Yes (gills)	EU	
Dictyopanus foliicolus Kobayasi (Note: Apparently it is the same species as given in Index Fungorum with a current name as Dictyopanus foliicola Kobayasi.)	Yes	Yes	Japan	
Eoscyphella luciurceolata Silva-Filho, Stevani & Desjardin	No	Yes	Brazil	
Favolaschia manipularis (Berk.) Teng (Note: This species is given in Audrey et al. (2015) as Filoboletus manipularis and in Corner (1954) as Mycena manipularis var. microporus, but Index Fungorum indicates that Favolaschia manipularis is the current name.)	?	Yes	Malaysia, Pacific islands	
Favolaschia tonkinensis (Pat.) Kuntze, 1898	No	Yes	Eastern India, China (Yunnan)	
Filoboletus hanedae (as 'hanedai′) Kobayasi (Note: This species is given in Kobayasi (1951) as Poromycena hanedae (as ′hanedai′) but Index Fungorum indicates that Filoboletus hanedae (as ′hanedai′) is the current name.)	?	Yes	Japan	
Filoboletus pallescens (Boedijn) Maas Geest.	?	Yes	Malaysia, Indonesia (Krakatoa)	
Favolaschia peziziformis (Berk. & M.A.Curtis) Sacc.	?	Yes	Japan	
Filoboletus yunnanensis P.G.Liu	?	Yes	China	
Gerronema viridilucens Desjardin, Capelari & Stevani	Yes	Yes	SA	
Marasmiellus venosus Har. Takah., Taneyama & Hadano	No	Yes	Japan	
Mycena aspratilis Maas Geest. & de Meijer	?	Yes (Hymenophore)	SA	
Mycena asterina Desjardin, Capelari & Stevani	Yes	Yes	SA	
Mycena cahaya A.L.C.Chew & Desjardin	Yes	Yes	Malaysia	
Mycena citricolor (Berk. & M.A.Curtis) Sacc.	Yes	No	SA, CA, Jamaica, El Salvador, Guatemala, Mexico, Puerto Rico	
Mycena chlorophos (Berk. & M.A.Curtis) Sacc.	Yes	Yes	Malaysia, Indonesia, Japan, Pacific Islands	
Mycena cristinae J.S. Oliveira	Yes	Yes	Brazil	
Mycena crocata (Schrad.) P. Kumm.	Yes	No	Europe	
Mycena coralliformis A.L.C. Chew & Desjardin	Yes	?	Malaysia	
Mycena daisyogunensis Kobayasi	?	Yes	Japan	
Mycena deeptha Aravind. & Manim.	Yes	No	India, Malaysia	
Mycena deformis Maas Geest. & de Meijer	Yes	No	Brazil	
Mycena deusta Maas Geest. & de Meijer	?	Yes	Brazil	
Mycena discobasis Metrod	?	Yes	SA, AF	
Mycena sp. "Erua (PDD 80772)"	Yes	Yes	NZ	
Mycena epipterygia (Scop.: Fr.) S.F.Gray	Yes	No	EU, NA, Japan	
Mycena fera Maas Geest. & de Meijer	?	Yes	SA	
Mycena flammifera Har. Takah. & Taneyama	?	Yes	Japan	
Mycena fulgoris Cortés-Pérez, Desjardin	No	Yes (stipe)	Mexico	
Mycena fusca Cleland	?	?	South Australia	
Mycena galopus (Pers.: Fr.) P.Kumm.	Yes	No	EU, NA, Japan	
Mycena globulispora Maas Geest. & de Meijer	Yes	Yes (basidiomes)	Brazil	
Mycena gombakensis A.L.C. Chew & Desjardin	Yes	Yes	Malaysia	
Mycena guzmanii Cortés-Pérez, Desjardin	Yes	Yes	Mexico	
Mycena haematopus (Pers.: Fr.) P.Kumm.	Yes	Yes	EU, NA, Japan	
Mycena illuminans Henn.	Yes	Yes	Malaysia, Japan	
Mycena inclinata (Fr.) Quél.	Yes	No	EU, NA, AF	
Mycena jingyinga C.C. Chang, C.Y. Chen, W.W. Lin & H.W. Kao	Yes	No	Taiwan	
Mycena kentingensis Y.S. Shih, C.Y. Chen, W.W. Lin & H.W. Kao	?	Yes	Taiwan	
Mycena lacrimans Singer	?	Yes	SA (Brazil)	
Mycena lazulina Har. Takah., Taneyama, Terashima & Oba	?	Yes	Japan, Taiwan, Vietnam, Australia	
Mycena lividorubra Segedin	Yes	No	Australia, NZ	
Mycena lucentipes Desjardin, Capelari & Stevani	Yes	Yes	SA, CA	
Mycena luguensis C.C. Chang, C.Y. Chen, W.W. Lin & H.W. Kao	Yes	No	Taiwan	
Mycena lumina Cortés-Pérez, Desjardin	No	Yes	Mexico	
Mycena luxaustralis P Sandoval-Leiva	?	Yes	Chile	
Mycena lux-coeli Corner	?	Yes	Japan	
Mycena luxaeterna B.A.Perry & Desjardin	Yes	Yes	SA	
Mycena luxarboricola B.A.Perry & Desjardin	No	Yes	SA	
Mycena luxfoliata Har. Takah., Taneyama & Terashima	Yes	No	Japan	
Mycena luxfoliicola Cortés-Pérez, Desjardin & Ram.-Cruz	Yes	Yes	Mexico	
Mycena luxperpetua B.A. Perry & Desjardin	Yes	Yes	Puerto Rico	
Mycena maculata P.Karst.	Yes	?	EU, NA, AF	
Mycena margarita (Murrill) Murrill	?	Yes (yellowish green light in all parts of the basidiome, or nonluminescent in some populations)	Caribbean - Florida (USA), Belize, Jamaica, Dominican Republic, Puerto Rico, Trinidad, Venezuela, Brazil	
Mycena nebula Cortés-Pérez, Desjardin & Rockefeller	No	Yes	Mexico	
Mycena nocticaelum A.L.C. Chew & Desjardin	Yes	Yes	Malaysia	
Mycena noctilucens Kawam. ex Corner (Note: This species is presumably given in Corner (1994) as Mycena Noctilucens var. magnispora but Index Fungorum indicates that Mycena Noctilucens is the current name.)	?	Yes	Malaysia, Pacific islands, South Solomons	
Mycena olivaceomarginata (Massee apud Cooke) Massee	Yes	No	EU, NA	
Mycena oratiensis Segedin	Yes	No	New Zealand	
Mycena oculisnymphae Desjardin, B.A. Perry & Stevanir	?	Yes (basidiome)	Brazil	
Mycena perlae Cortés-Pérez, Desjardin & Rockefeller	No	Yes	Mexico	
Mycena podocarpi G. Stev.	Yes	No	NZ	
Mycena polygramma (Bull.: Fr.) S.F.Gray	Yes	No	AF, EU, NA, Japan	
Mycena pruinosoviscida Corner (Note: This species is given in Corner (1954) and presumably in Corner (1994) as Mycena pruinoso-viscida and Mycena pruinoso-viscida var. rabaulensis but Index Fungorum indicates that Mycena pruinosoviscida is the current name.)	?	Yes (and spores)	AU, Malaysia, Japan (Hachijō-jima)	
Mycena pseudostylobates Kobayasi	Yes	?	Japan	
Mycena pura (Pers.: Fr.) P.Kumm.	Yes	No	EU, NA, SA, Japan	
Mycena rosea (Bull.) Gramberg	Yes	No	EU	
Mycena roseoflava (G.Stev.)	Yes	Yes	NZ	
Mycena rubroglobulosa (Segedin)	Yes	Yes	NZ	
Mycena sanguinolenta (Alb. & Schwein.: Fr.) P.Kumm.	Yes	No	EU, NA, Japan	
Mycena seminau A.L.C.Chew & Desjardin	Yes	Yes	Malaysia	
Mycena silvaelucens B.A.Perry & Desjardin	?	Yes (pileus, lamellae, stipe)	Malaysia	
Mycena sinar A.L.C.Chew & Desjardin	Yes	Yes	Malaysia	
Mycena sinar var. tangkaisinar A.L.C.Chew & Desjardin	?	Yes	Malaysia	
Mycena singeri Lodge	?	Yes	SA, CA	
Mycena stellaris Har.Takah., Taneyama & Hadano	?	Yes	Taiwan	
Mycena stylobates (Pers.: Fr.) P.Kumm.	Yes	No	AF, EU, NA, Japan	
Mycena sublucens Corner	No	Yes	Malaysia	
Mycena tintinnabulum (Fr.) Quél.	Yes	No	EU	
Mycena venus C.C. Chang, C.Y. Chen, W.W. Lin & H.W. Kao	Yes	No	Taiwan	
Mycena vinacea Cleland	?	Yes (basidiomes)	AU, NZ	
Mycena zephirus (Fr.: Fr.) P.Kumm.	Yes	No	EU	
Neonothopanus gardneri (Berk. ex Gardner) Capelari, Desjardin, Perry, Asai & Stevani	Yes	Yes	SA	
Neonothopanus nambi (Speg.) Petersen & Krisai-Greilhuber	Yes	Yes	AU, SA, CA, Malaysia	
Nothopanus eugrammus (Mont.) Singer (Note: This species is given in Corner (1981) as Pleurotus eugrammus var. radicicolus, but Index Fungorum indicates that Nothopanus eugrammus is the current name.)	No	Yes	Japan, Malaysia, Singapore	
Nothopanus noctilucens (Lév.) Singer	?	Yes	Japan	
Omphalotus flagelliformis Zhu L. Yang & B. Feng	Yes	Yes	China	
Omphalotus illudens (Schwein.) Bresinsky & Besl.	Yes	Yes	EU, NA	
Omphalotus japonicus (Kawam.) Kirchm. & O.K.Mill. (Note: This species is given in Zang (1979) as Lampteromyces luminescens, but Index Fungorum indicates that Omphalotus japonicus is the current name.)	Yes	Yes	China, Korea, Japan, Taiwan	
Omphalotus mangensis (J.Li & X.Hu) Kirchm. & O.K.Mill.	?	Yes	China	
Omphalotus nidiformis (Berk.) O.K.Mill.	?	Yes	AU	
Omphalotus olearius (DC.: Fr.) Singer	Yes	Yes	EU, US	
Omphalotus olivascens H.E.Bigelow, O.K.Mill. & Thiers	No	Yes	NA	
Omphalotus subilludens (Murrill) H.E.Bigelow	Yes	Yes	US	
Panellus luminescens (Corner) Corner	Yes	Yes	Malaysia	
Panellus luxfilamentus A.L.C. Chew & Desjardin	Yes	?	Malaysia	
Panellus pusillus (Pers. ex Lév.) Burdsall & O.K.Mill. (Note: This species is given in Corner (1954) as Dictyopanus pusillus var. sublamellatus and in Kobayasi (1963), Corner (1954), Corner (1986) as Panellus gloeocystidiatus but Index Fungorum indicates that Panellus pusillus is the current name.)	Yes	Yes	AF, AU, NA, SA, Malaysia, Japan	
Panellus stipticus (Bull.: Fr.) P.Karst.	Yes	Yes	AU, AF, EU, NA, SA, Japan	
Poromycena hanedai	Yes	Yes	Japan	
Pleurotus decipiens Corner	?	Yes	Malaysia	
Resinomycena petarensis Desjardin, B.A. Perry & Stevani	Yes	No	Brazil	
Roridomyces irritans (E.Horak) Rexer	No	Yes	AU	
Roridomyces phyllostachydis Karun., Mortimer and Axford	No	Yes	India	
Roridomyces pruinosoviscidus A.L.C. Chew & Desjardin	Yes	Yes	Malaysia, Bismark Archipelago	
Roridomyces lamprosporus (Corner) Rexer (Note: This species is given in Corner (1994), Corner (1950), Horak (1978) as Mycena lamprospora, but Index Fungorum indicates that Roridomyces lamprosporus is the current name.)	No	Yes (spores)	Malaysia, AU	
Roridomyces roridus (Fr.) Rexer (Note: This species is given in Desjardin et al. (2008) as Mycena rorida, but both Index Fungorum and MycoBank indicate that Roridomyces roridus is the current name.)	Yes	No	EU, NA, SA, Japan	
Roridomyces sublucens Edred John Henry CornerCorner	No	Yes (stipe and gills)	Amboina (Indonesia)	
Roridomyces viridiluminus L.A.P. Dauner, Karunarathna & P.E. Mortimer	Yes	Yes	China (Yunnan)	
Tricholoma sciodes (Pers.) C. Martín	Yes	No	Lithuania	
Xylaria hypoxylon (L.) Grev.	?	Allegedly (?)	EU	

== See also ==
- List of bioluminescent organisms
