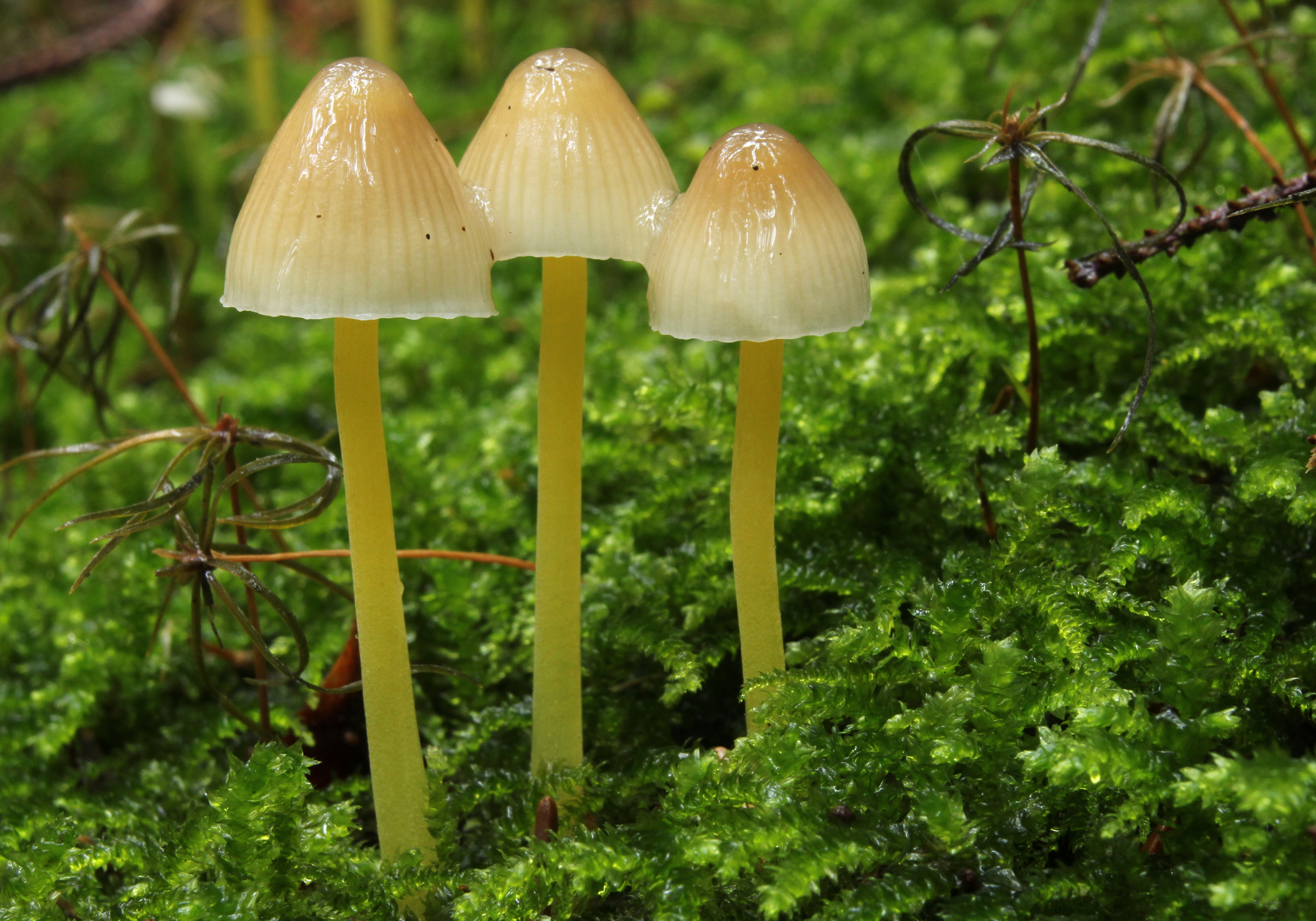

Scientific classification
- Kingdom: Fungi
- Division: Basidiomycota
- Class: Agaricomycetes
- Order: Agaricales
- Family: Mycenaceae
- Genus: Mycena
- Species: M. epipterygia

Binomial name
- Mycena epipterygia (Scop.) Gray
- Countries in which M. epipterygia is present (green)

= Mycena epipterygia =

Species of fungi

Mycena epipterygia Mycological characteristics
- Gills on hymenium
- Hymenium is adnate
- Stipe is bare
- Spore print is white
- Ecology is saprotrophic
- Edibility is not recommended

Mycena epipterygia is a species of fungus in the family Mycenaceae of mushrooms commonly found in Europe. It is commonly known as yellowleg bonnet or yellow-stemmed mycena. Mycena nivicola has been suggested as a separate species name for the Western variety.

== Description ==
The cap is striate, bell-shaped at first, but becoming convex, or occasionally nearly flat with the margin turning up slightly. The cap has a sticky surface from which the cuticle can be peeled and measures 1 to 2 cm (3/8 to 3/4 in) wide, with a colour varying from yellowish brown to gray-brown. The margin is somewhat irregular, and the flesh white and fragile. The stipe is long and slender, about 4–9 cm (1 5/8–3 1/2 in) tall and 1–2 mm wide; it does not taper, and is yellowish to yellow-green, an identifying feature.

The gills are white to cream, sometimes tinged with pink when older; they are fairly widely spaced, adnate, or slightly decurrent. The spores are amyloidic and have a length of 8 to 10 micrometres and a width of 4 to 5.5 μm. The spore print is white to very pale buff.

The mycelium is bioluminescent.

=== Similar species ===
The species resembles Mycena aurantiidisca, M. clavicularis, M. leptocephala, and Roridomyces roridus.

== Distribution and habitat ==
M. epipterygia is a common species in Western Europe (amongst others Netherlands and Belgium). It grows in deciduous and coniferous woods, heather, and acid grasslands, amongst grasses and mosses. This species grows on the ground. In Britain, the fruiting bodies appear from August to November. In the North American Pacific Northwest, the species appears in groups, in needle litter and on wood.

The species is saprotrophic.

== Edibility ==
The species is considered edible, but of little culinary interest.

== See also ==
- List of bioluminescent fungi
