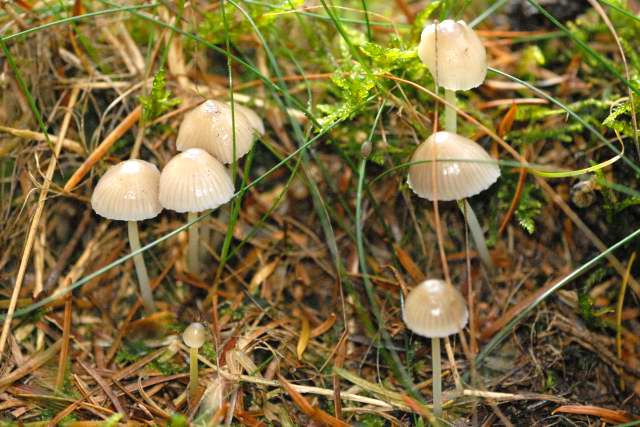

Scientific classification
- Kingdom: Fungi
- Division: Basidiomycota
- Class: Agaricomycetes
- Order: Agaricales
- Family: Mycenaceae
- Genus: Mycena
- Species: M. olivaceomarginata

Binomial name
- Mycena olivaceomarginata (Massee) Massee (1893)

Synonyms
- Agaricus olivaceomarginatus Massee (1890); Mycena avenacea var. olivaceomarginata (Massee) Rea (1922)

= Mycena olivaceomarginata =

Species of fungus

Mycena olivaceomarginata is a species of agaric fungus in the family Mycenaceae. Originally described as Agaricus olivaceomarginata by English mycologist George Edward Massee in 1890, he transferred it to Mycena in 1893. Found in Europe and North America, the mycelium of the fungus is bioluminescent.

It was described from Great Britain.

== See also ==
- List of bioluminescent fungi
