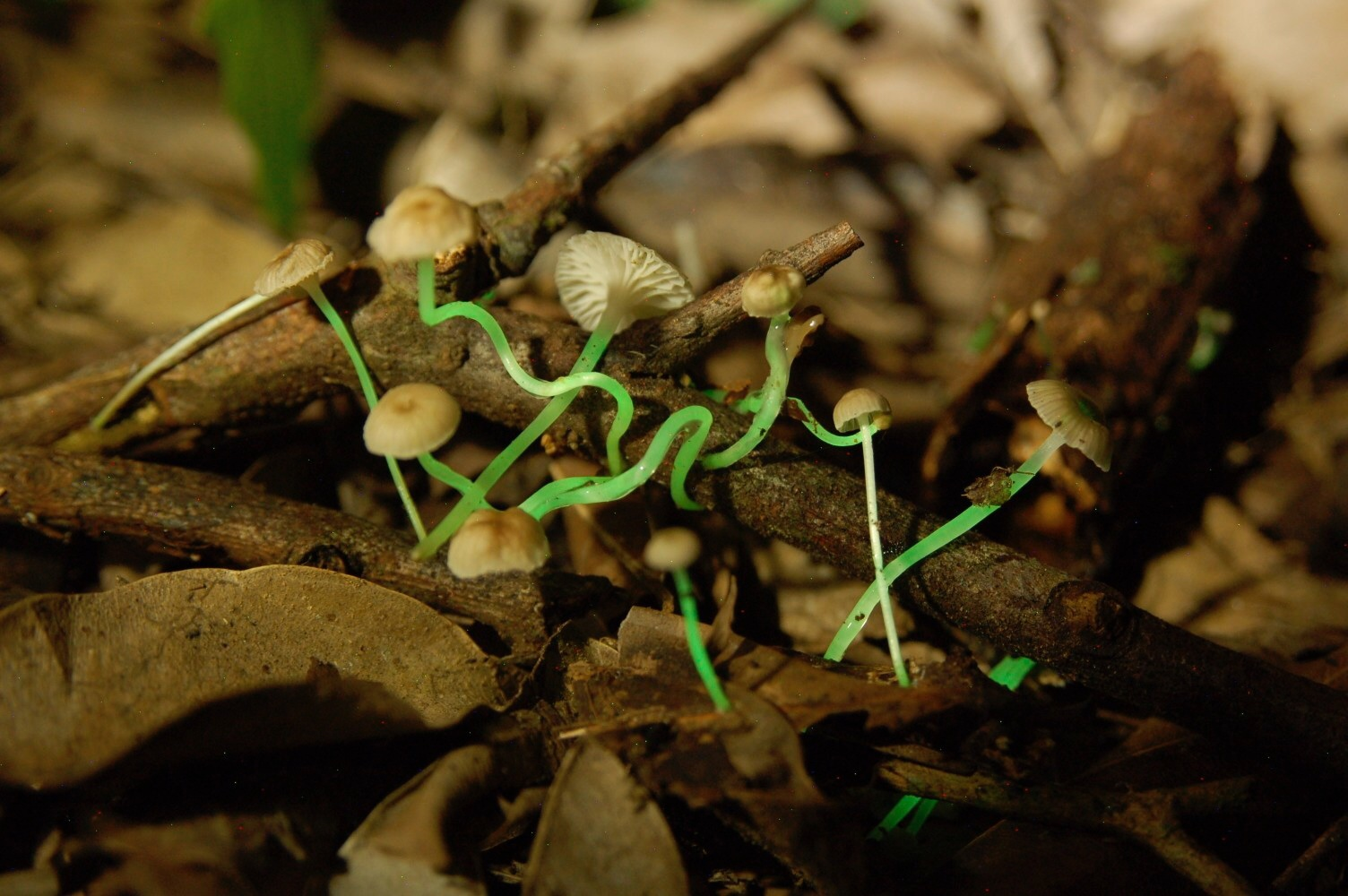

Scientific classification
- Kingdom: Fungi
- Division: Basidiomycota
- Class: Agaricomycetes
- Order: Agaricales
- Family: Mycenaceae
- Genus: Mycena
- Species: M. luxaeterna

Binomial name
- Mycena luxaeterna Desjardin, B.A. Perry & Stevani (2010)
- M. luxaeterna is known only from a single site in Iporanga, in São Paulo State, Brazil

= Mycena luxaeterna =

Species of fungus

Mycena luxaeterna Mycological characteristics
- Gills on hymenium
- Cap is convex
- Hymenium is adnate
- Stipe is bare
- Spore print is white
- Ecology is saprotrophic
- Edibility is unknown

Mycena luxaeterna, commonly known as the eternal light mushroom, is a species of fungus in the family Mycenaceae. The mushrooms have parachute-shaped caps which start off darkly grayish-brown, changing to grayish-yellow or pale grayish-brown with a pale white ring at the edge when mature, and reach up to 2 cm (0.79 in) in diameter. Their thin, cylindrical, hollow, fragile stems up to 8 mm (0.31 in) in diameter are covered in a thick gel and emit a constant yellow-green bioluminescence (the caps do not glow). The gills are attached. The mushroom has a slightly radish-like smell and similar slightly bitter taste.

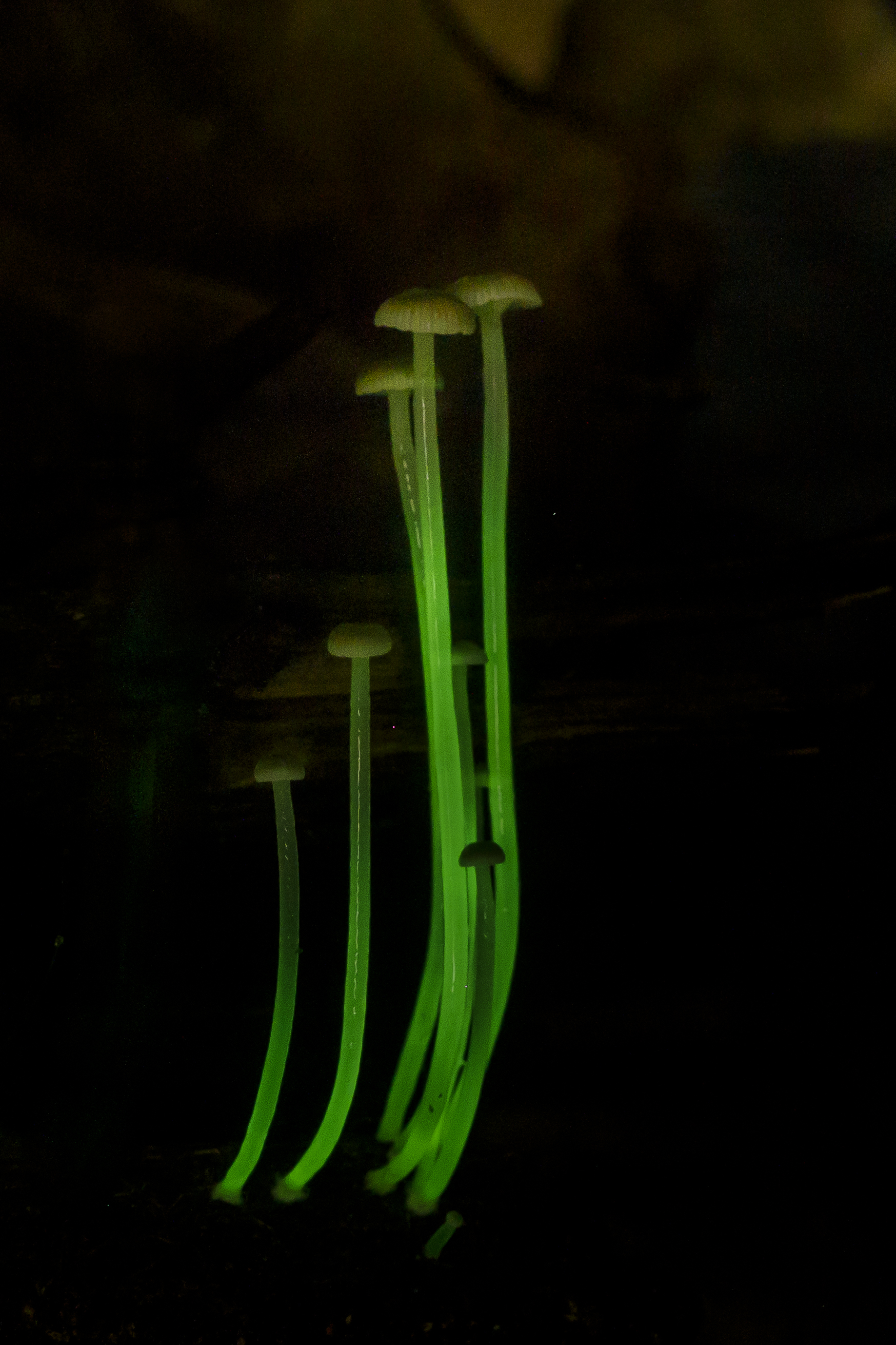
Mycena luxaeterna

== Habitat ==
The mushroom was discovered in a very limited area of the Atlantic rain forest of São Paulo, Brazil and is known to exist only at this location. It grows on decomposing twigs, rarely on dead leaves or undergrowth, and in clusters of two-to-twenty individuals. Dennis Desjardin is credited with the discovery.

== Uses ==
The eternal light mushroom has no known nutritional value, contains no known hallucinogens, and is not reported as having any particular cultural significance. Its extreme rarity means that it has never been common in cooking.

== See also ==
- List of bioluminescent fungi
