= Mycena pseudostylobates =

Scientific classification
- Kingdom: Fungi
- Division: Basidiomycota
- Class: Agaricomycetes
- Order: Agaricales
- Family: Mycenaceae
- Genus: Mycena
- Species: M. pseudostylobates

Binomial name
- Mycena pseudostylobates Kobayasi (1951)

Species of fungus

Mycena pseudostylobates is a species of agaric fungus in the family Mycenaceae. It is bioluminescent. It was originally found on the leaves of Quercus gilva in Japan.

== See also ==
- List of bioluminescent fungi
