= Poromycena hanedai =

Scientific classification
- Kingdom: Fungi
- Division: Basidiomycota
- Class: Agaricomycetes
- Order: Agaricales
- Family: Mycenaceae
- Genus: Poromycena
- Species: P. hanedai

Binomial name
- Poromycena hanedai Kobayasi (1951)

Synonyms
- Filoboletus hanedai (Kobayasi) Hongo (1955)

Species of fungus

Poromycena hanedai is a species of agaric fungus in the family Mycenaceae. Found in Japan, the species was first described by Kobayasi in 1951. It is bioluminescent.

== See also ==
- List of bioluminescent fungi
