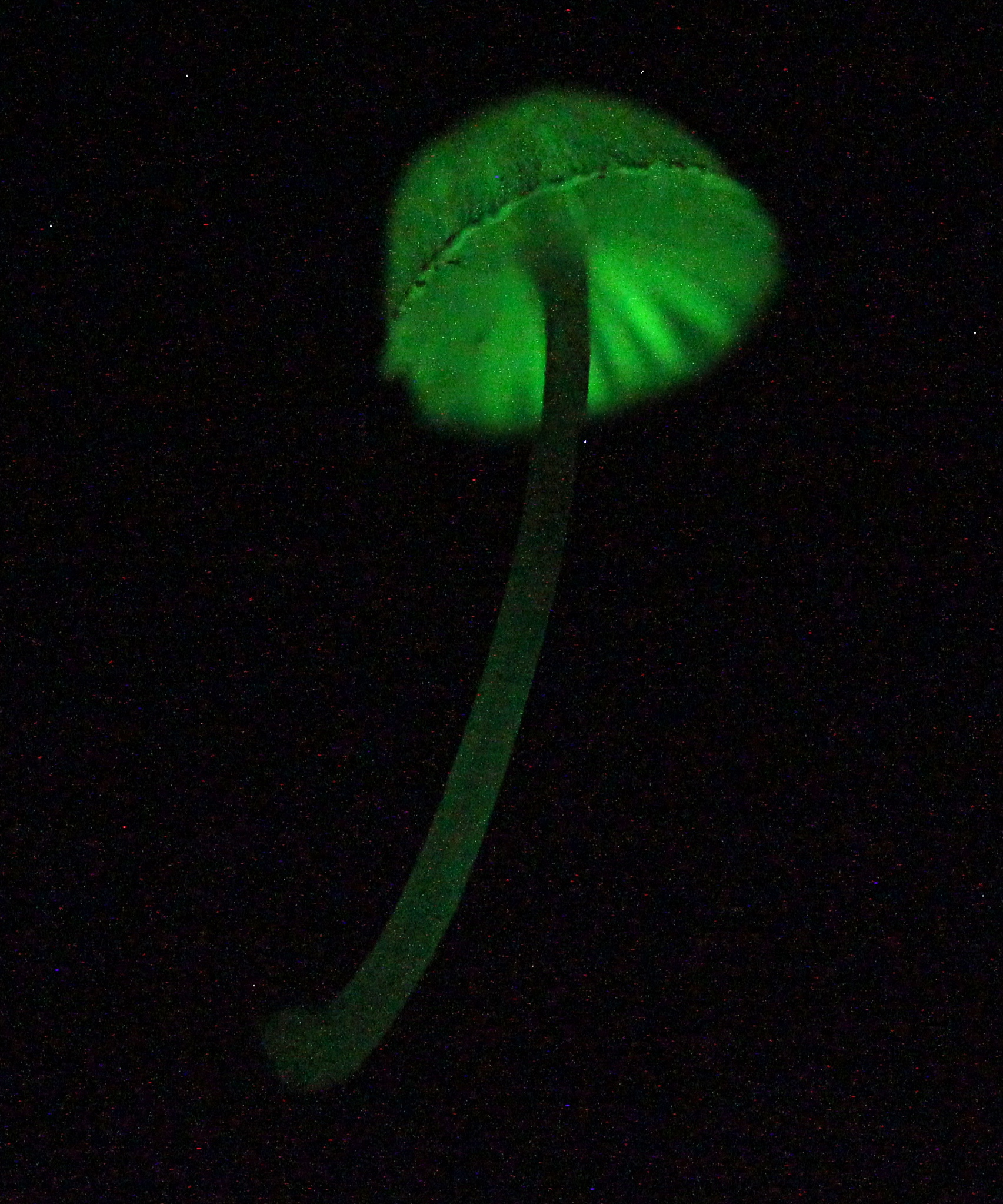

Scientific classification
- Kingdom: Fungi
- Division: Basidiomycota
- Class: Agaricomycetes
- Order: Agaricales
- Family: Mycenaceae
- Genus: Mycena
- Species: M. singeri

Binomial name
- Mycena singeri Lodge (1988)

= Mycena singeri =

Species of fungus

Mycena singeri is a species of agaric fungus in the family Mycenaceae. Described as new to science in 1988 by Jean Lodge, it is bioluminescent. In 2007, the first reported luminescent species were found from a single site in primary Atlantic Forest habitat in the Alto Ribeira Tourist State Park, São Paulo State, Brazil.

== See also ==
- List of bioluminescent fungi
