= Mycena lacrimans =

Scientific classification
- Kingdom: Fungi
- Division: Basidiomycota
- Class: Agaricomycetes
- Order: Agaricales
- Family: Mycenaceae
- Genus: Mycena
- Species: M. lacrimans

Binomial name
- Mycena lacrimans Singer (1989)

Species of fungus

Mycena lacrimans is a species of agaric fungus in the family Mycenaceae. Found in South America, the fruit bodies of the fungus are bioluminescent.

== See also ==
- List of bioluminescent fungi
