= Mycena daisyogunensis =

Scientific classification
- Kingdom: Fungi
- Division: Basidiomycota
- Class: Agaricomycetes
- Order: Agaricales
- Family: Mycenaceae
- Genus: Mycena
- Species: M. daisyogunensis

Binomial name
- Mycena daisyogunensis Kobayasi (1951)

Species of fungus

Mycena daisyogunensis is a species of agaric fungus in the family Mycenaceae. The fruit bodies of the fungus are bioluminescent. It was collected from Daisyogun Cave in Miyazaki Prefecture on Kyushu, Japan.

== See also ==
- List of bioluminescent fungi
