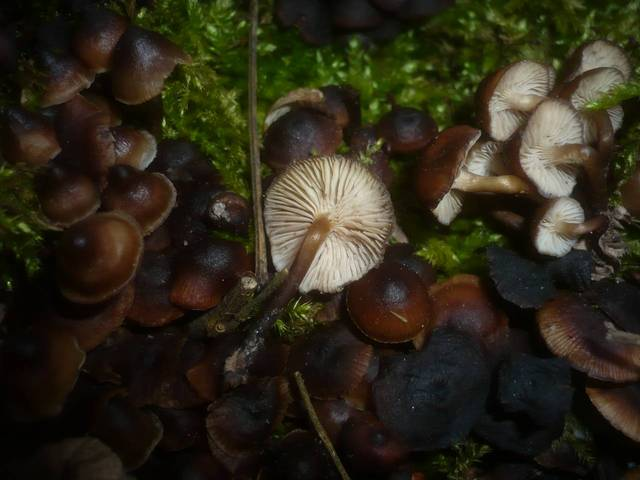

Scientific classification
- Kingdom: Fungi
- Division: Basidiomycota
- Class: Agaricomycetes
- Order: Agaricales
- Family: Mycenaceae
- Genus: Mycena
- Species: M. tintinnabulum

Binomial name
- Mycena tintinnabulum (Paulet) Quél. (1872)

Synonyms
- Agaricus tintinnabulum Batsch (1783)

= Mycena tintinnabulum =

Species of fungus

Mycena tintinnabulum is a European species of agaric fungus in the family Mycenaceae. The mycelium, but not the fruit body, is bioluminescent.

== See also ==
- List of bioluminescent fungi
