= Mycena sublucens =

Scientific classification
- Kingdom: Fungi
- Division: Basidiomycota
- Class: Agaricomycetes
- Order: Agaricales
- Family: Mycenaceae
- Genus: Mycena
- Species: M. sublucens

Binomial name
- Mycena sublucens Corner (1954)

Species of fungus

Mycena sublucens is a species of agaric fungus in the family Mycenaceae. Found in Indonesia, it was described as new to science in 1954 by English mycologist E. J. H. Corner. The fruit bodies are bioluminescent.

== See also ==
- List of bioluminescent fungi
