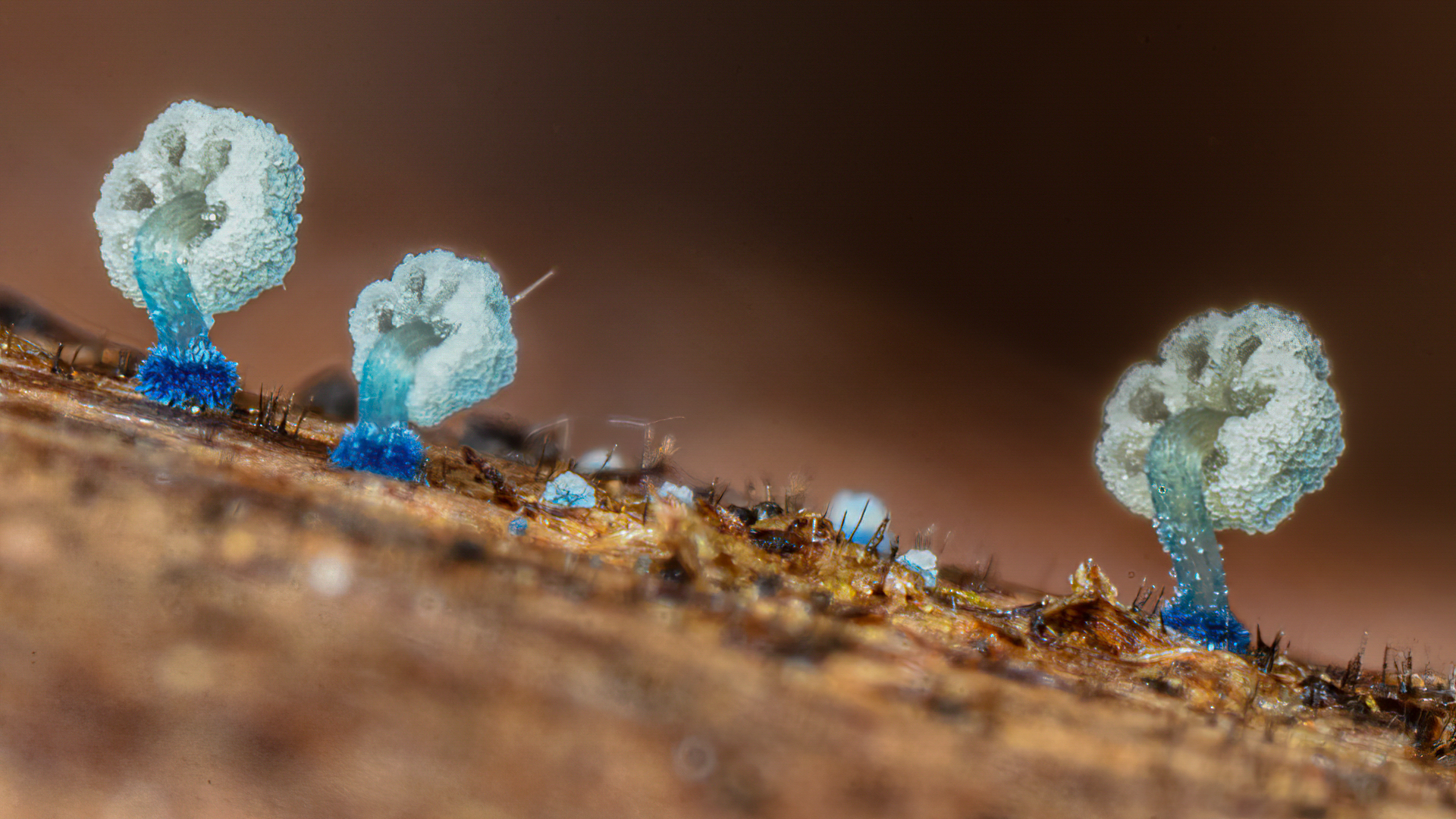

Scientific classification
- Domain: Eukaryota
- Kingdom: Fungi
- Division: Basidiomycota
- Class: Agaricomycetes
- Order: Agaricales
- Family: Mycenaceae
- Genus: Mycena
- Species: M. lazulina

Binomial name
- Mycena lazulina Har. Takah., Taneyama, Terashima & Oba

= Mycena lazulina =

Species of fungus

Mycena lazulina Mycological characteristics
- Gills on hymenium
- Cap is convex
- Hymenium is adnate
- Stipe is bare
- Spore print is white
- Ecology is saprotrophic
- Edibility is unknown

Mycena lazulina is a bioluminescent species of mushroom in the genus Mycena and family Mycenaceae.

It was first described in 2016 from southwestern Japan. The specific epithet, lazulina, is Latin for blue (cf. lapis lazuli).

== See also ==
- List of bioluminescent fungi
