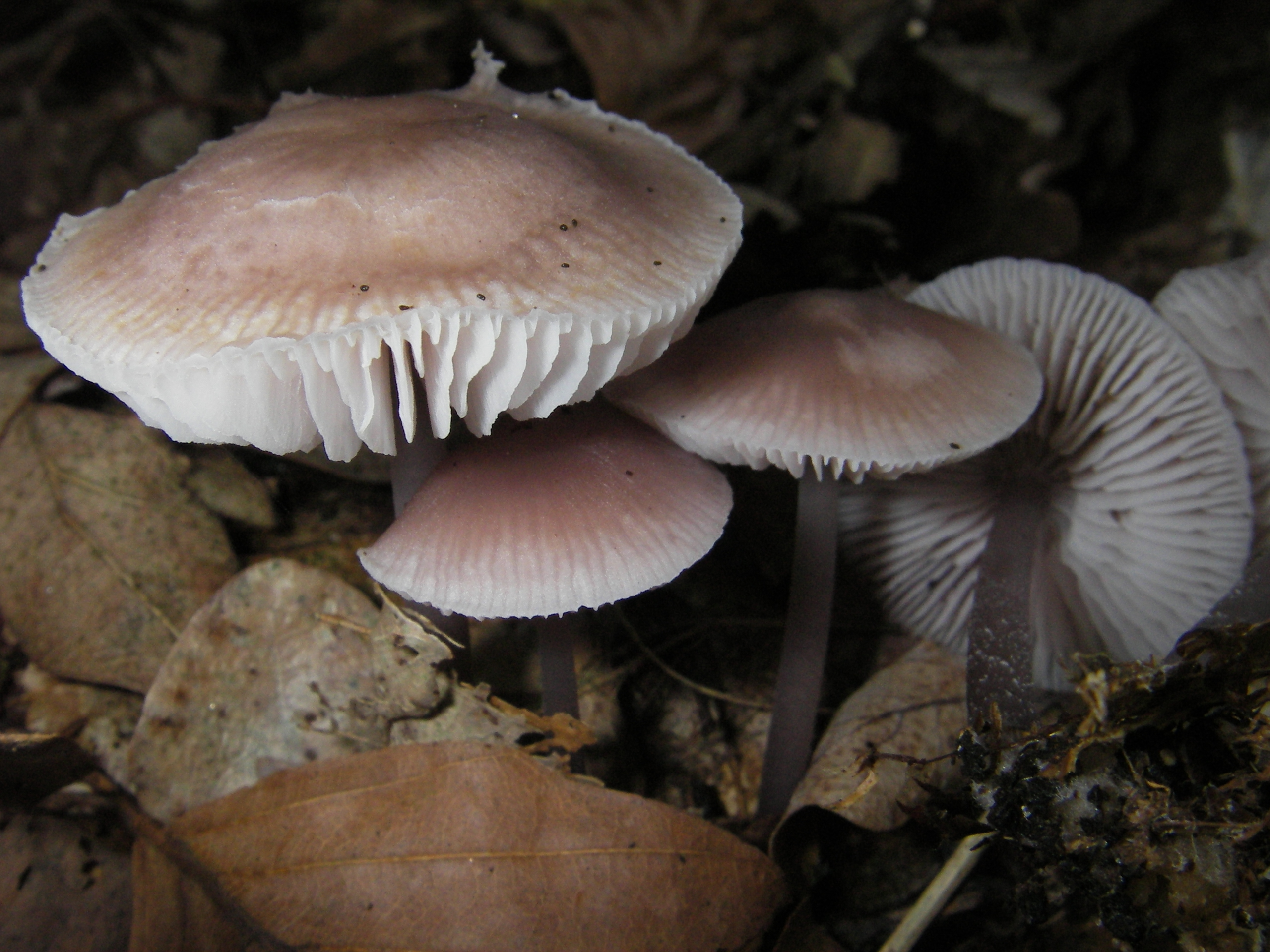

Scientific classification
- Kingdom: Fungi
- Division: Basidiomycota
- Class: Agaricomycetes
- Order: Agaricales
- Family: Mycenaceae
- Genus: Mycena
- Species: M. pura

Binomial name
- Mycena pura (Pers.) P. Kumm.

= Mycena pura =

Species of fungus

Mycena pura
- Mycological characteristics
- Gills on hymenium
- Cap is flat
- Hymenium is adnexed
- Stipe is bare
- Spore print is white
- Ecology is saprotrophic
- Edibility is poisonous

Mycena pura, commonly known as the lilac mycena, lilac bonnet, is a species of mushroom in the family Mycenaceae.

== Taxonomy ==
First called Agaricus prunus in 1794 by Christian Hendrik Persoon, it was assigned its current name in 1871 by German Paul Kummer.

== Description ==
Mycena pura is a tiny to medium-sized mushroom that can grow in a variety of hues, frequently with purple undertones. The cap ranges from 2 to 6 centimetres (3/4 to 2 1/4 in) in size. It is violet to purple when young but can change color with age. It can be convex, flat, or bell-shaped. The gills are pale or pinkish in color and get cross veins as they age. The stem is 4 to 10 cm (1 1/2 to 4 in) long and 2 to 6 millimetres (1/8 to 1/4 in) thick. It is colored like the cap, hollow, and the same shade. There is no ring on the mushroom. It has a radish-like scent. The spores are white and produce a white spore print.

It produces a faint bioluminescence, visible at night.

=== Similar species ===
Similar species include Clitocybe nuda, Laccaria amethysteo-occidentalis, M. purpureofusca, and M. pelianthina.

== Distribution and habitat ==
It is widely dispersed across North America and can be found beneath conifers or occasionally hardwoods as decomposing forest litter.

== Ecology ==
Mycena pura is known to bioaccumulate the element boron.

== Toxicity ==
Given that it includes the toxin muscarine, it should not be consumed.

Despite the presence of toxins, some guides list M. pura as edible.

== Bioactive compounds ==
Mycena pura contains the chemical puraquinonic acid, a sesquiterpene. This compound induces mammalian cells (specifically, the cell line HL60) to differentiate into granulocyte- or macrophage-like cells. The fungus also contains the antifungal metabolite strobilurin D, previously found in Cyphellopsis anomala.

== Gallery ==
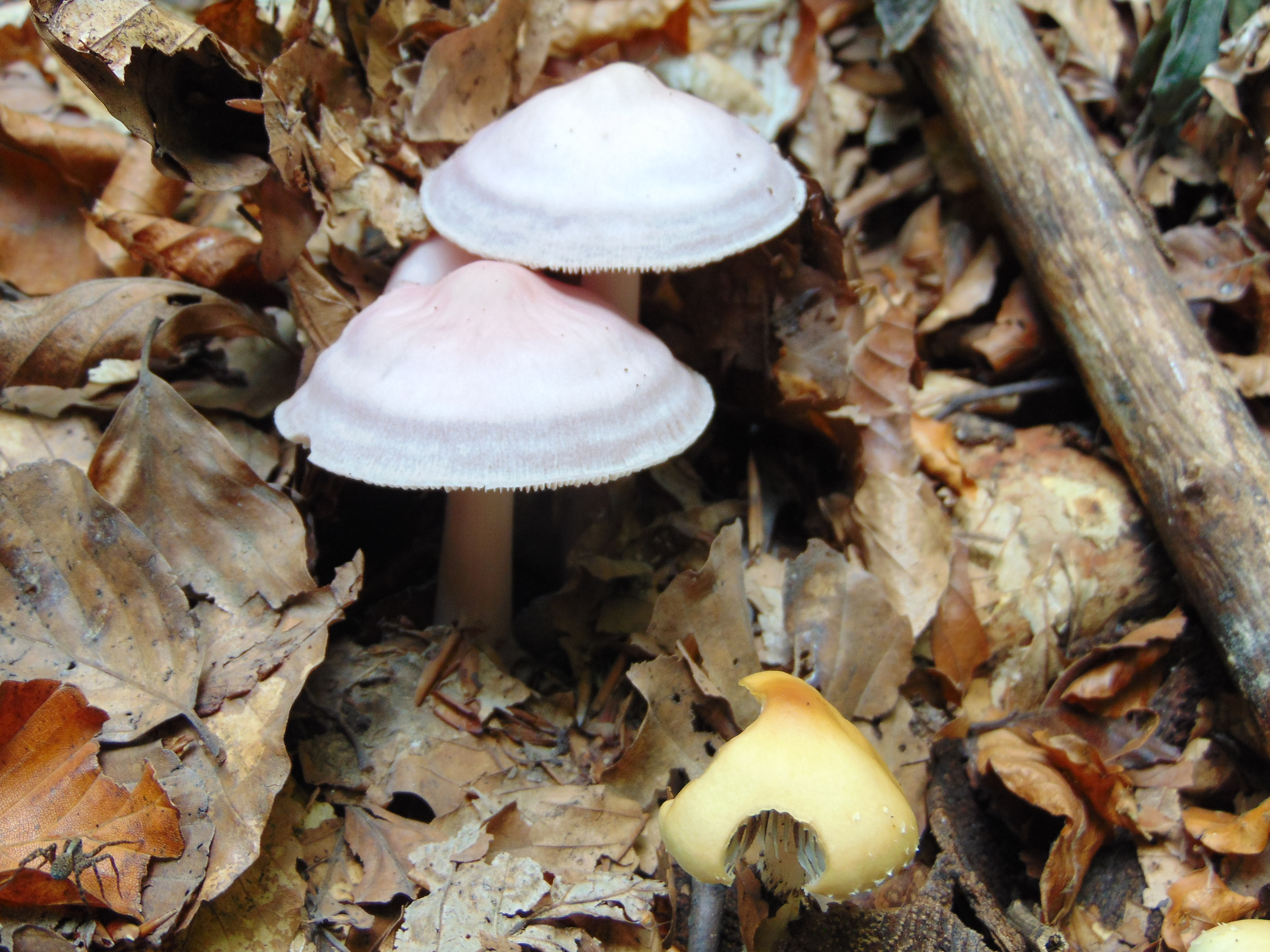

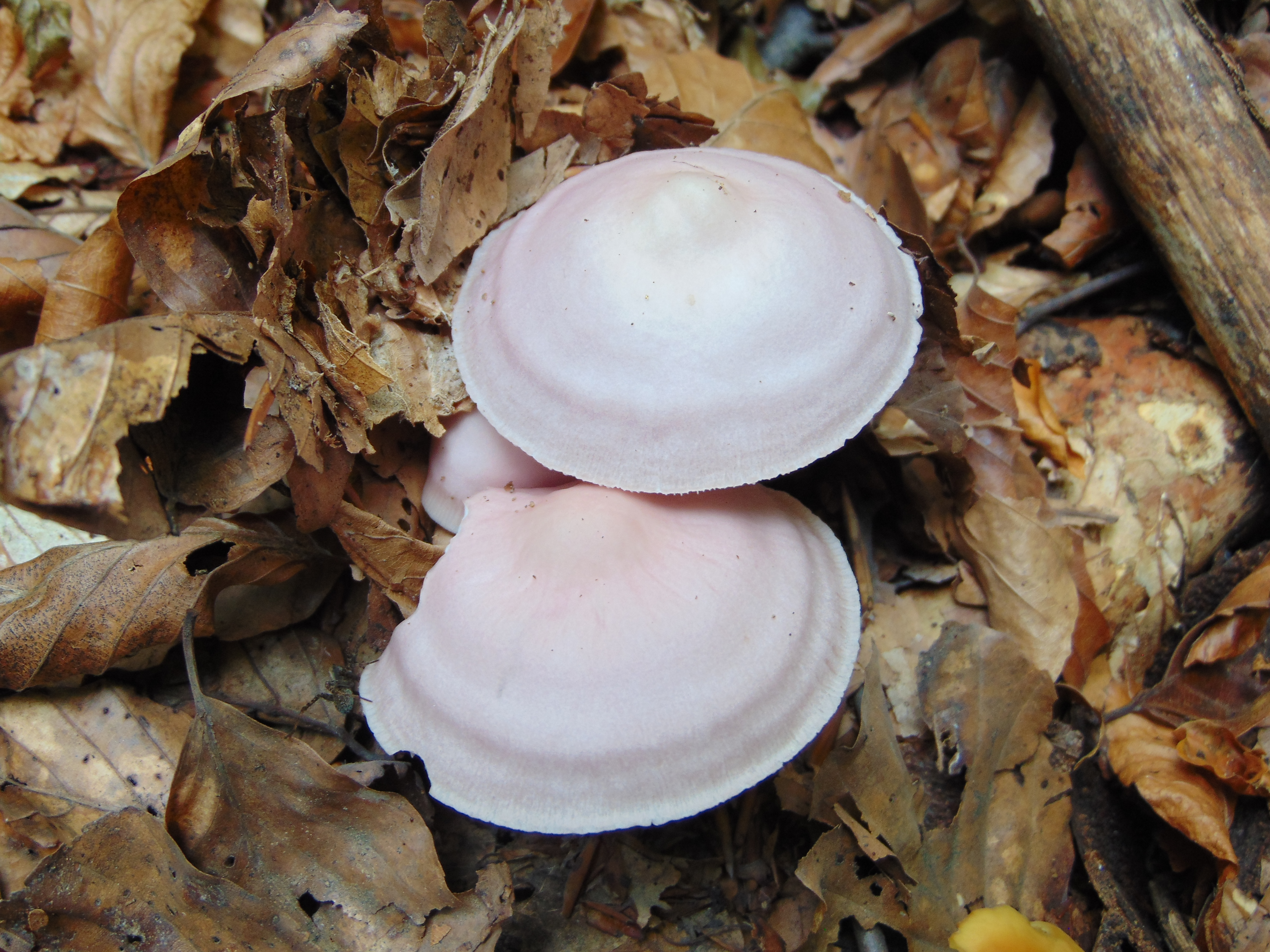

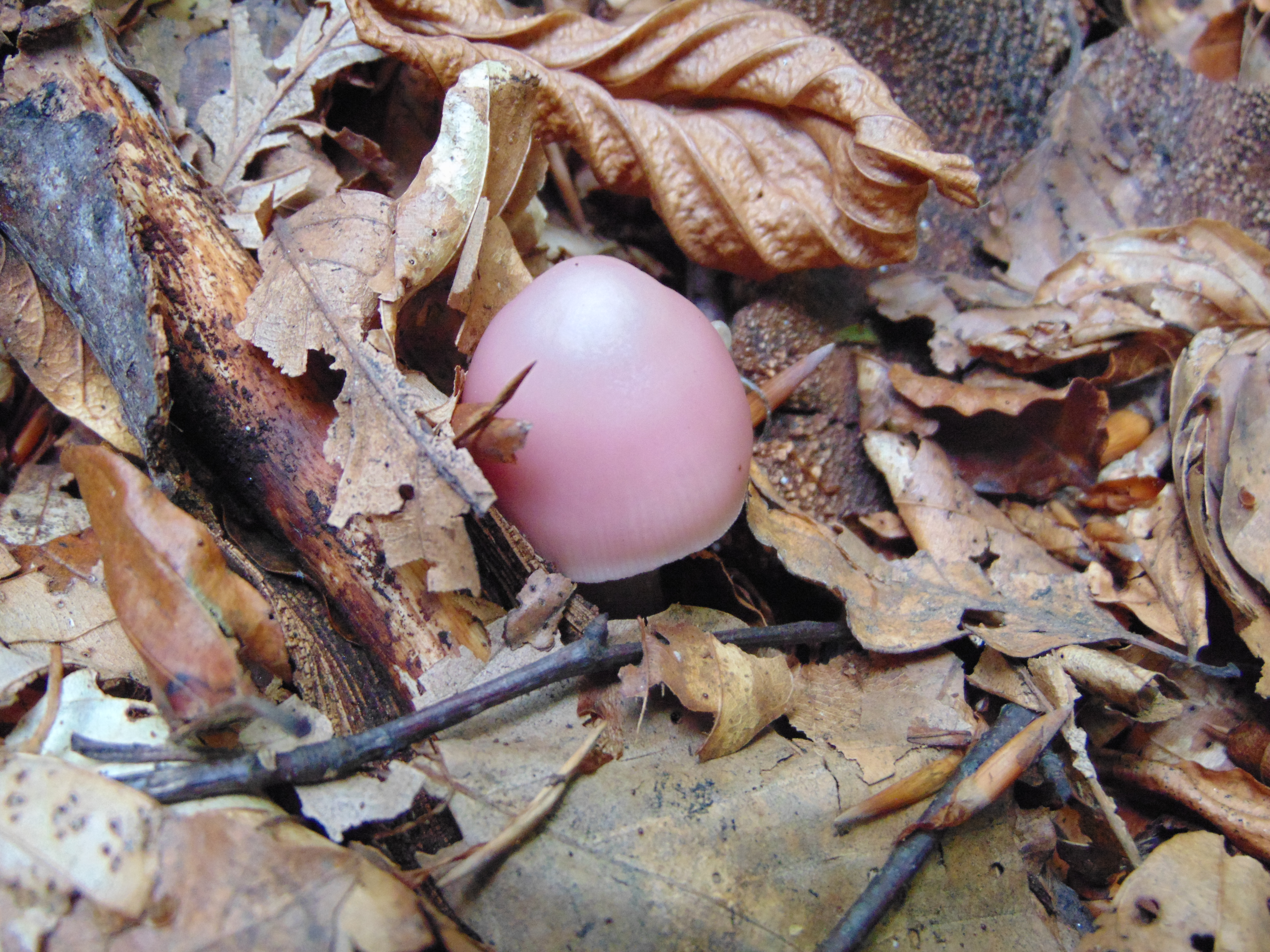

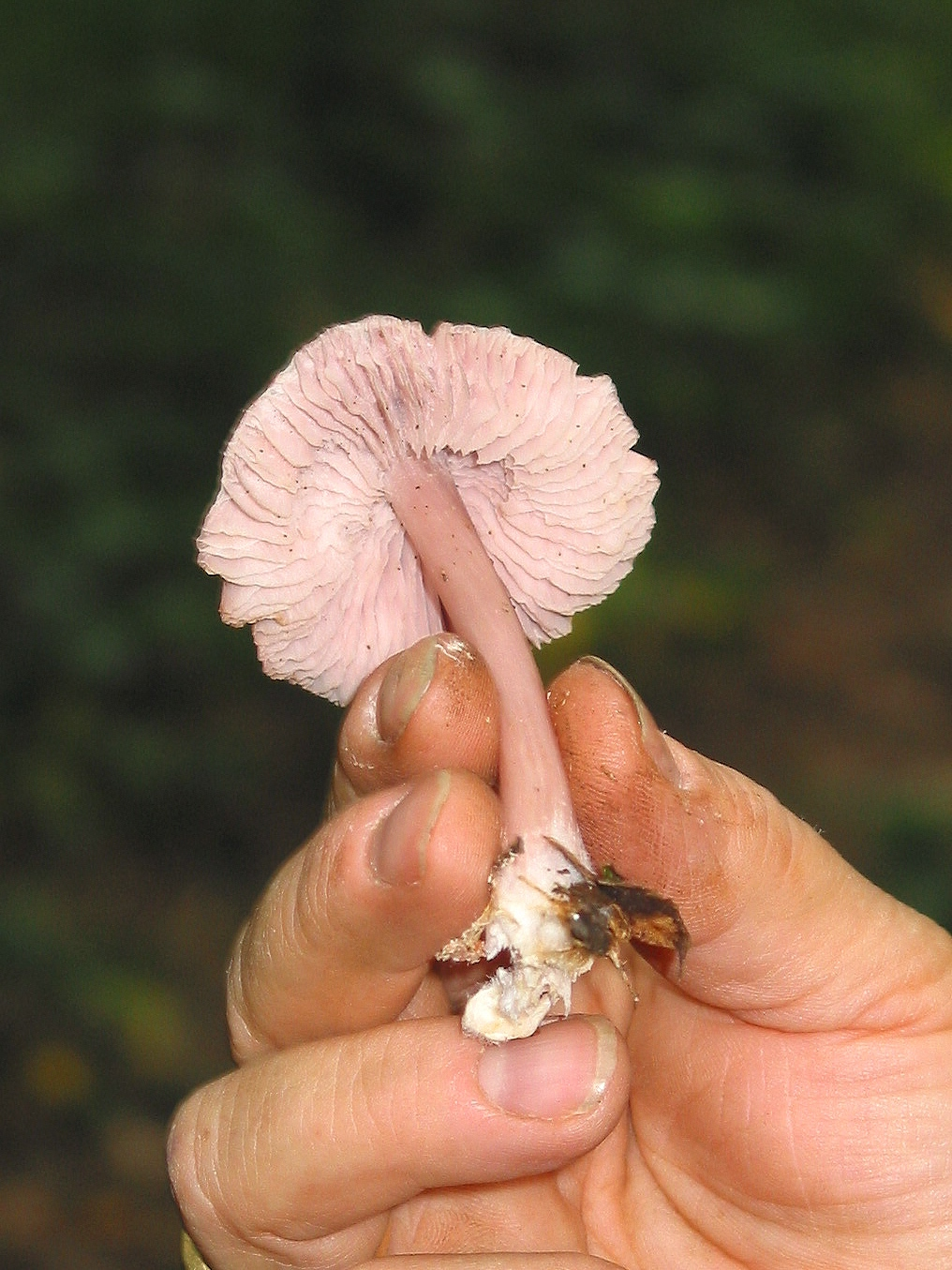

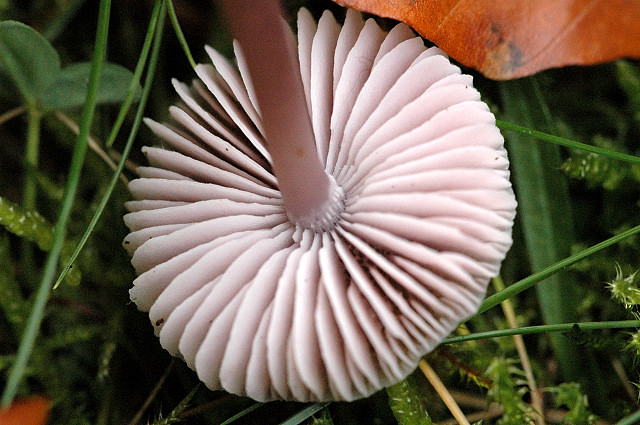

== See also ==
- List of bioluminescent fungus species
- Mycena rosea
