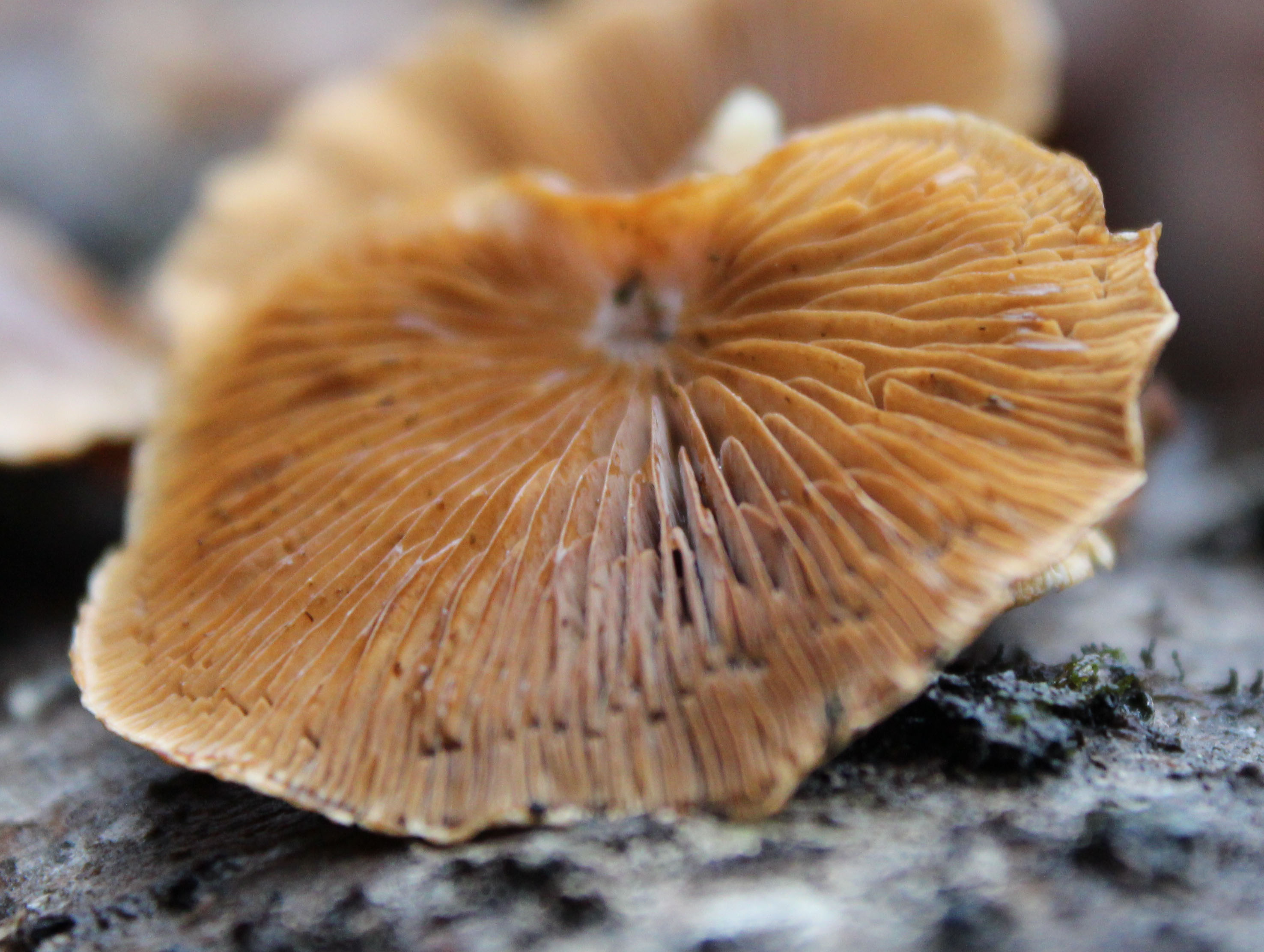

Scientific classification
- Kingdom: Fungi
- Division: Basidiomycota
- Class: Agaricomycetes
- Order: Agaricales
- Family: Mycenaceae
- Genus: Tectella
- Species: T. patellaris

Binomial name
- Tectella patellaris (Fr.) Murrill

= Tectella patellaris =

Tectella patellaris
- Mycological characteristics
- Gills on hymenium
- Cap is infundibuliform
- Hymenium is free
- Stipe is bare or lacks a stipe
- Spore print is white
- Ecology is saprotrophic
- Edibility is inedible

Tectella patellaris, commonly known as the veiled panus, is a species of mushroom in the family Mycenaceae. The small, inconspicuous, dull brown mushroom is found in groups or clusters on the decaying wood of broad-leaved trees. Young specimens are easily recognized by the presence of a partial veil, as there are no other agarics that lack a stipe and have a partial veil.

== Description ==
The cap may be somewhat viscid when wet. Dimensions of the cap are approximately 0.5–2.0 cm across. The fruit body is generally small, brown, and clamshell-shaped. Tectella patellaris often lacks a true stem, but may include a very short one: the stipitate point of attachment manifests as a lateral extension of the pileus, ranging from 0.1 to 0.3 cm. The gills radiate from this central point of attachment. This mushroom is saprobic and found on fallen logs of hardwoods in North America and Europe. The specific epithet patellaris means "dish shaped". The mushroom is commonly known as the "Veiled Panus". The snuff brown gills of young specimens are covered with a buff white ephemeral partial veil that may be absent in older specimens. The spore deposit from Tectella patellaris is white. The species is inedible.

=== Microscopic characteristics ===
The spores are 3–4 × 1–1.5 μm, smooth, and cylindrical, and weakly amyloid. Spores are white in mass. Cheilocystidia are present on gill edges.

=== Similar species ===
Tectella patellaris can be distinguished from other saprophytic, white-spored, pendulous species by the presence of its partial veil and unique lamellar attachment. Panellus stipticus is tougher, lacks the partial veil, and is luminescent. Crepidotus mollis and Crepidotus applanatus are brown-spored.

== Habitat and distribution ==
Tectella patellaris is widely distributed in North America and Europe and due to its inconspicuous and unassuming presence, may be more common than is reported.
