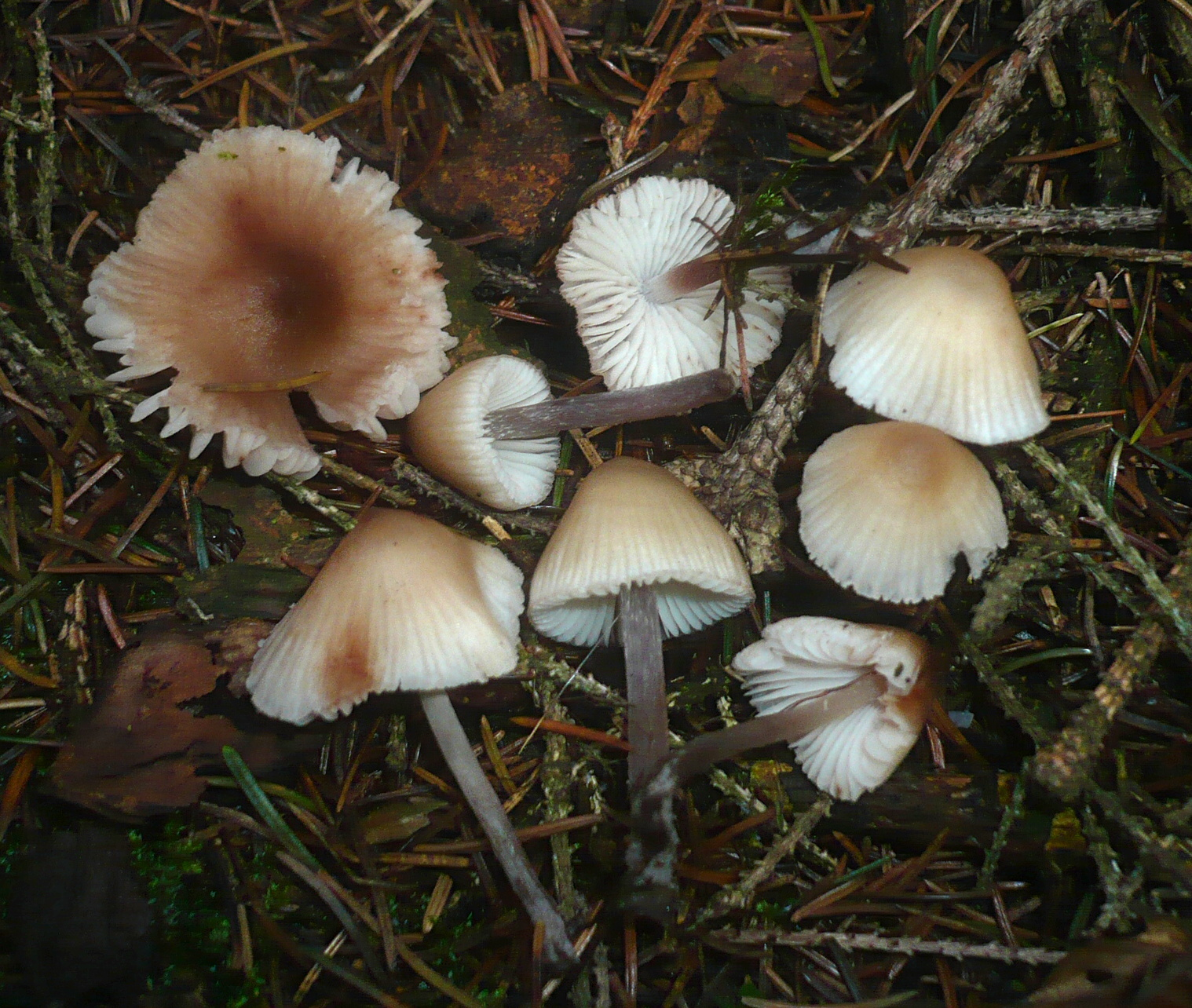

Scientific classification
- Kingdom: Fungi
- Division: Basidiomycota
- Class: Agaricomycetes
- Order: Agaricales
- Family: Mycenaceae
- Genus: Mycena
- Species: M. zephirus

Binomial name
- Mycena zephirus (Fr.) P.Kumm. (1871)

Synonyms
- Agaricus zephirus Fr. (1818)

= Mycena zephirus =

Species of fungus

Mycena zephirus is a species of agaric fungus in the family Mycenaceae. It is bioluminescent.

== See also ==
- List of bioluminescent fungi
