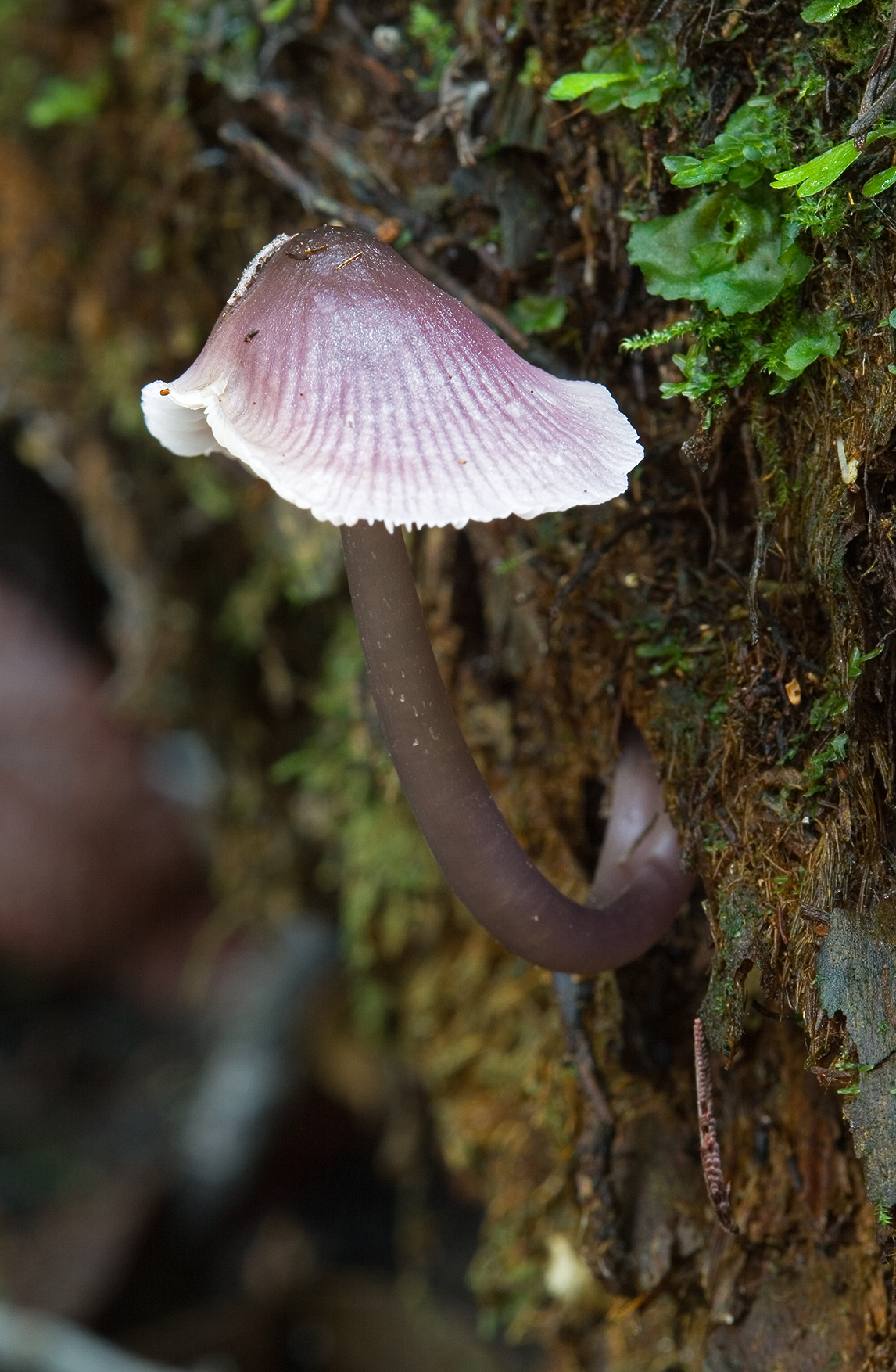

Scientific classification
- Domain: Eukaryota
- Kingdom: Fungi
- Division: Basidiomycota
- Class: Agaricomycetes
- Order: Agaricales
- Family: Mycenaceae
- Genus: Mycena
- Species: M. vinacea

Binomial name
- Mycena vinacea Cleland

= Mycena vinacea =

Species of fungus

Mycena vinacea Mycological characteristics
- Gills on hymenium
- Cap is conical
- Hymenium is adnate
- Stipe is bare
- Spore print is white
- Ecology is saprotrophic
- Edibility is unknown

Mycena vinacea is a species of mushroom in the family Mycenaceae. Found in Australia, it was first described scientifically by John Burton Cleland in 1931.
