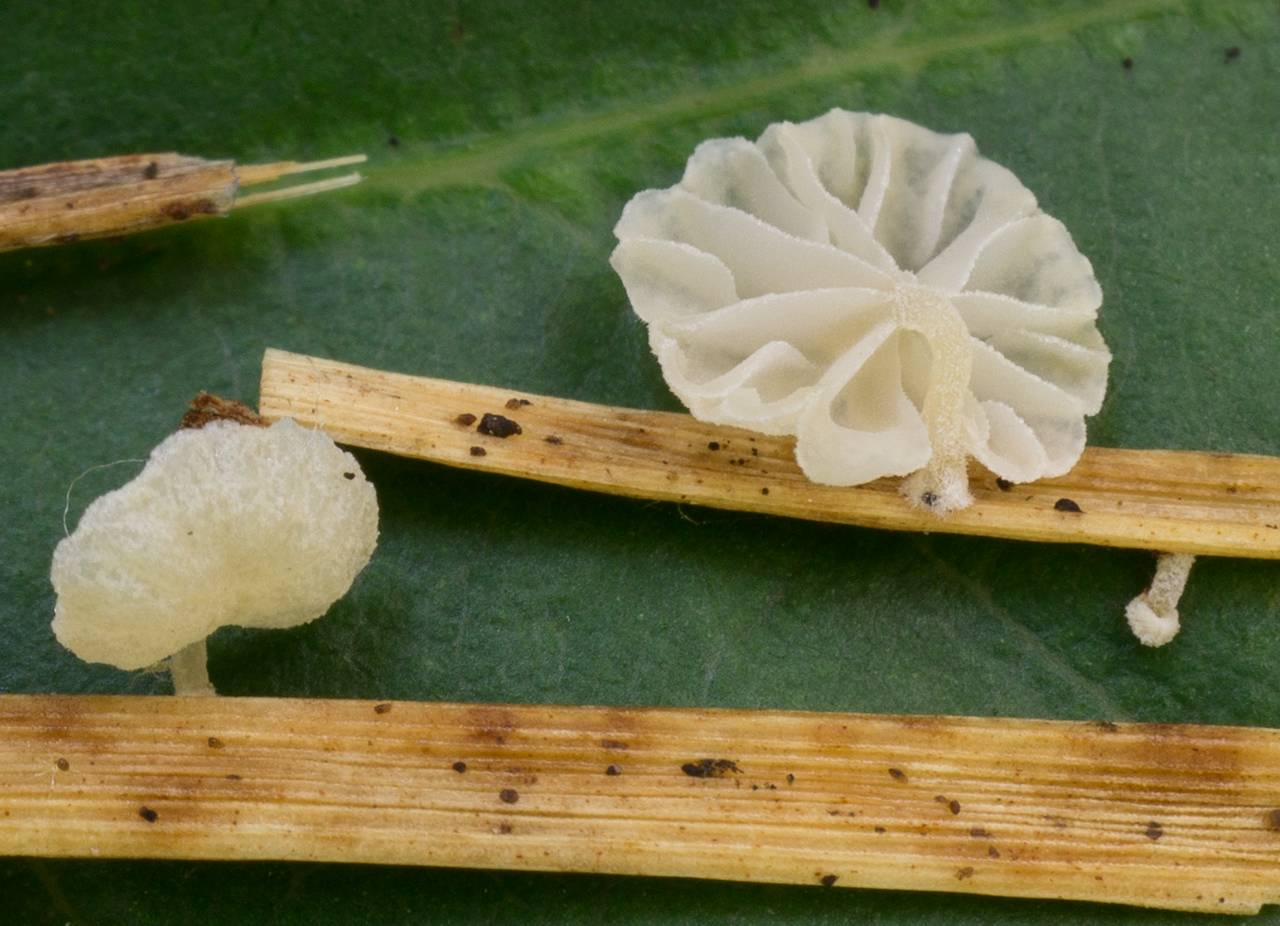
- Resinomycena saccharifera

Scientific classification
- Kingdom: Fungi
- Division: Basidiomycota
- Class: Agaricomycetes
- Order: Agaricales
- Family: Mycenaceae
- Genus: Resinomycena; Redhead & Singer

Type species
- Resinomycena rhododendri (Peck) Redhead & Singer

Species
- R. acadiensis R. brunnescens R. japonica R. mirabilis R. montana R. pyrenaica R. rhododendri R. saccharifera

= Resinomycena =

Genus of fungi

Resinomycena is a genus of fungi in the mushroom family Mycenaceae. The genus contains at least eight species found in North America, Europe (including the United Kingdom and the Canary Islands) and eastern Asia (including Japan). This genus of small white to tan colored agarics is saprophytic and colonizes leaf litter, bark, small twigs and decaying monocot vegetation. The fruitbodies are small and resemble Mycena or Marasmius or Hemimycena and are distinguished by amyloid spores, poorly dextrinoid tissues, and the abundant oily, resinous cystidia on the pileus, lamellae edges and stipes. One recently described species, Resinomycena fulgens from Japan that is a synonym of Resinomycena japonica, has luminescent fruitbodies.
