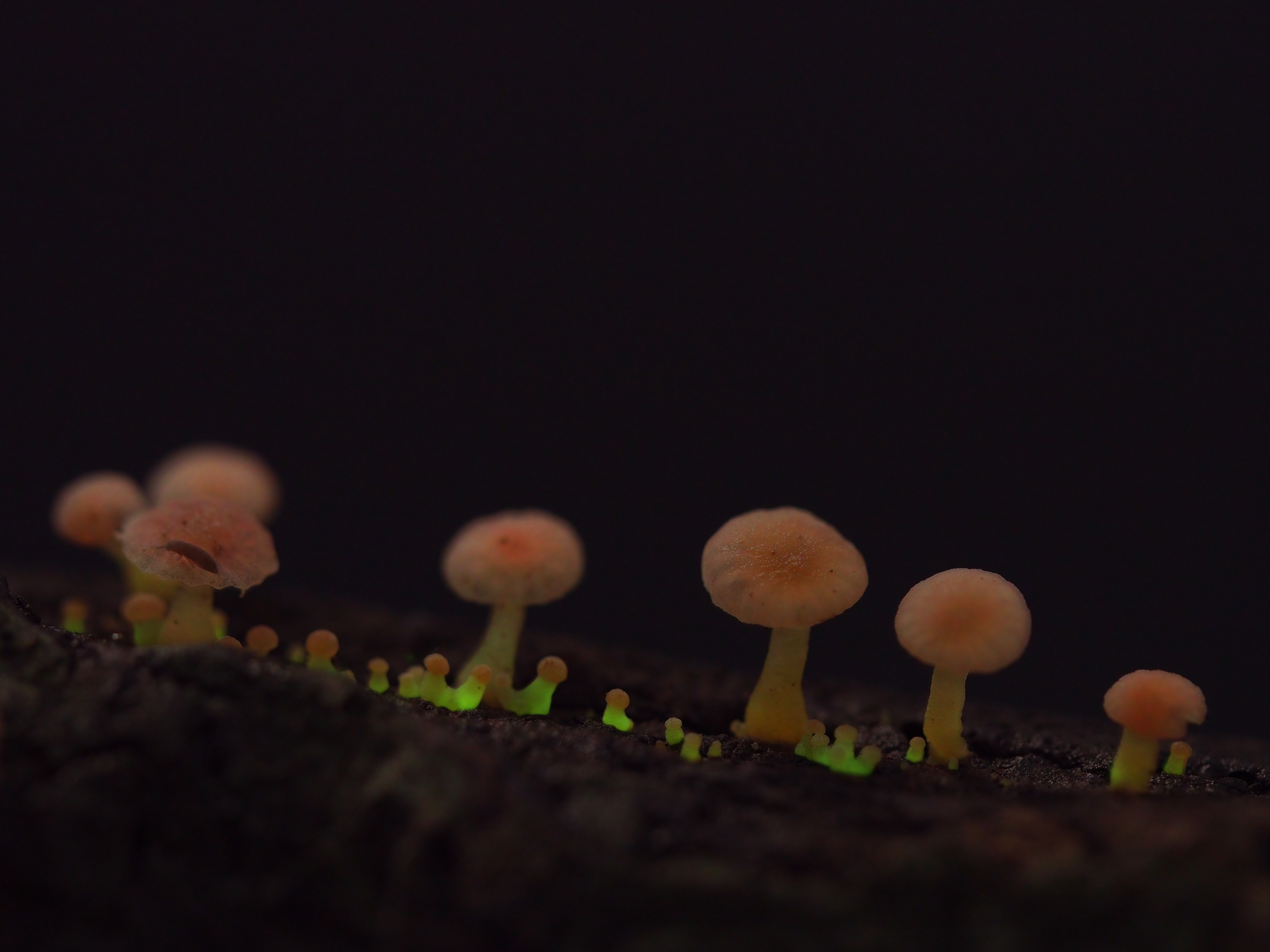
- Bioluminescent Mycena roseoflava found throughout New Zealand

Scientific classification
- Kingdom: Fungi
- Division: Basidiomycota
- Class: Agaricomycetes
- Order: Agaricales
- Family: Mycenaceae
- Genus: Mycena
- Species: M. roseoflava

Binomial name
- Mycena roseoflava G.Stev. (1964)

Synonyms
- Insiticia roseoflava (G. Stev.) E. Horak

= Mycena roseoflava =

Species of fungus

Mycena roseoflava is a species of agaric mushroom in the family Mycenaceae. It was first discovered in 1964 by New Zealand mycologist Greta Stevenson. It is a wood-inhabiting mushroom native to New Zealand.

The small fungus is saprotrophic, meaning it gains nutrients from decaying organic matter and appears on stressed or dying plants, often found on rotting wood and twigs. As matter decomposes within a medium in which a saprotroph is residing, the saprotroph breaks such matter down into its composites.

M. roseoflava has white spores with small white caps, normally standing at a height of 5–10 millimeters and an equal width. It is most active in the autumn season and is not considered edible. The stem relatively short is often attached to the side of wood, usually with a slightly swollen stem base. It is rare to see in Victoria, where it has only found only in wetter forests and rainforests, but is somewhat common in Tasmania.

In the first descriptions of the mushroom, Stevenson noted the caps were "pink fading yellowish, hemispherical with a shallow central umbilicus." The texture of the caps were smooth to minutely floccose. The gills were described as adnate to slightly concurrent. The spores were observed to be globose, amyloid, and thin-walled.

In 2021, the species was discovered to be bioluminescent, this never having been recorded previously. According to New Zealand Fungarium curator Dr. Maj Padamsee, "It could have been found before but it just hadn't been recorded – people who had been out in the forest might have seen something because it's not very bright… it's a very pale light colour." The enzymes produced from the compound luciferin gives the mushrooms their glow, as it also does with fireflies and some marine organisms. The discovery of bioluminescence was made during an event dedicated to studying fungus that took place on Stewart Island.
