= Decapitatus =

Scientific classification
- Kingdom: Fungi
- Division: Basidiomycota
- Class: Agaricomycetes
- Order: Agaricales
- Family: Mycenaceae
- Genus: Decapitatus; Redhead & Seifert

Type species
- Decapitatus flavidus (Cooke) Redhead & Seifert

Genus of fungi

Decapitatus is a genus of fungus in the family Mycenaceae. The genus, an anamorph of Mycena, is monotypic, containing the single species Decapitatus flavidus.
