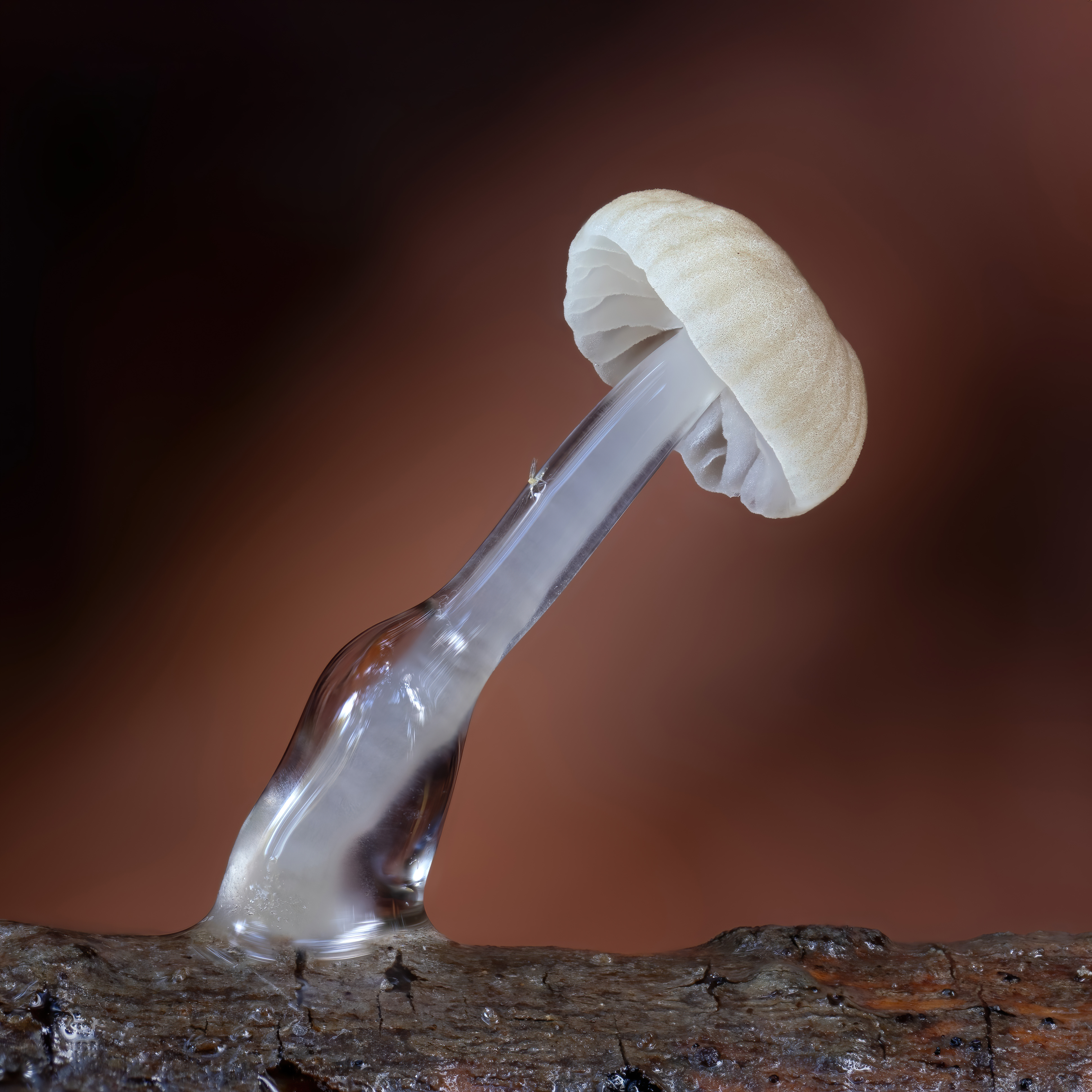

Scientific classification
- Kingdom: Fungi
- Division: Basidiomycota
- Class: Agaricomycetes
- Order: Agaricales
- Family: Mycenaceae
- Genus: Roridomyces
- Species: R. roridus

Binomial name
- Roridomyces roridus (Fr.) Rexer (1994)

Synonyms
- Agaricus roridus Scop. (1772); Agaricus roridus Fr. (1815); Mycena rorida (Fr.) Quél. (1872)

= Roridomyces roridus =

Species of fungus

Roridomyces roridus
- Mycological characteristics
- Gills on hymenium
- Cap is conical
- Hymenium is adnate
- Stipe is bare
- Spore print is white
- Ecology is saprotrophic
- Edibility is unknown

Roridomyces roridus, commonly known as the dripping bonnet or the slippery mycena, is a species of agaric fungus in the family Mycenaceae.

The mushroom cap is tannish, fading to whitish or dirty yellow in color, broadly convex, and 5–15 mm (0.2–0.6 in) in diameter. The whitish stipe is covered with a thick, slippery slime layer. The species can be bioluminescent, and is one of the several causative species of foxfire.

It resembles some other members of the genus. It is of no known culinary value due to its small size and slippiriness.

== See also ==
- List of bioluminescent fungi
