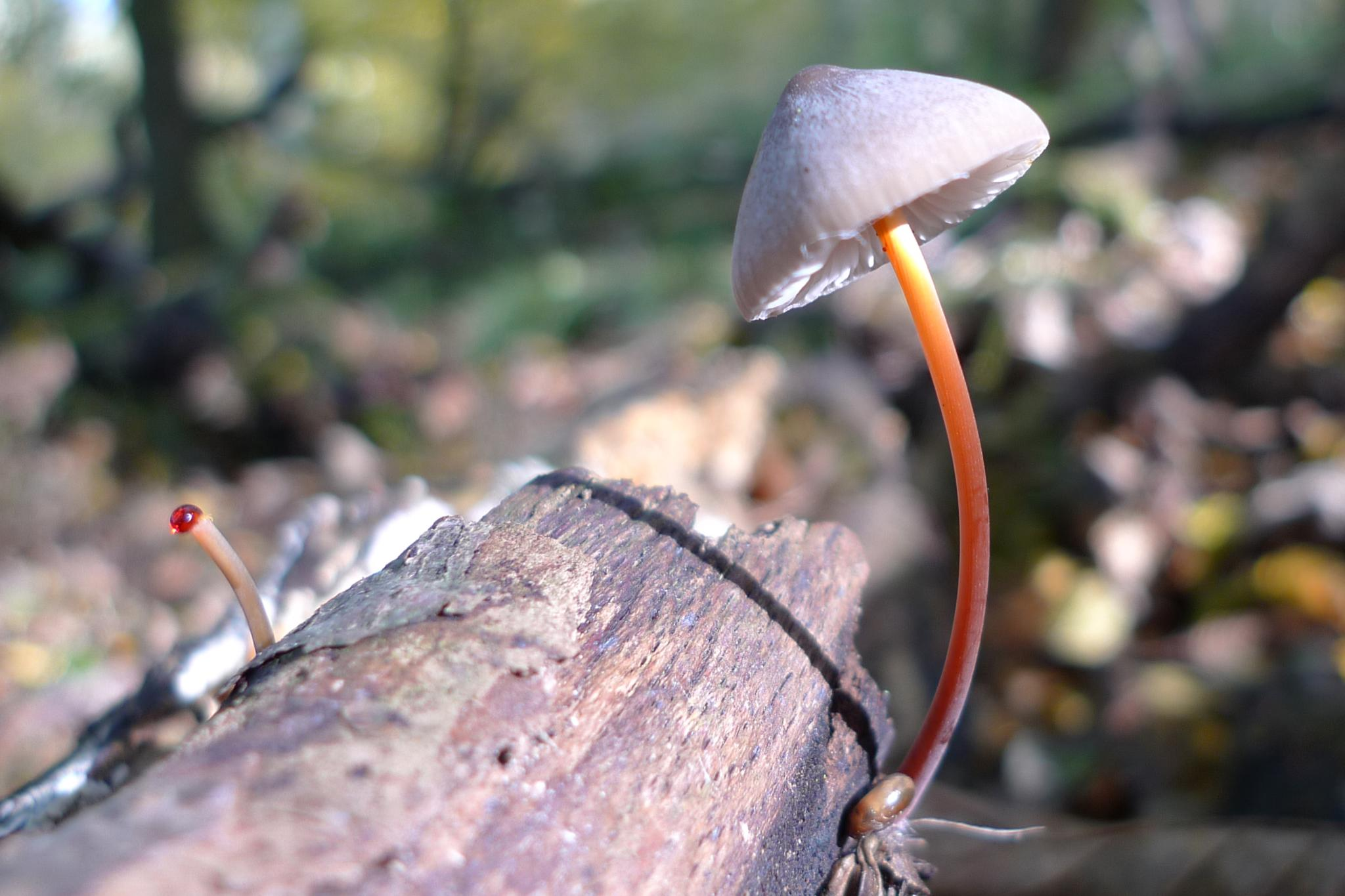
- M. crocata exuding red latex from broken stipe

Scientific classification
- Domain: Eukaryota
- Kingdom: Fungi
- Division: Basidiomycota
- Class: Agaricomycetes
- Order: Agaricales
- Family: Mycenaceae
- Genus: Mycena
- Species: M. crocata

Binomial name
- Mycena crocata (Schrad.) P.Kumm. (1871)

Synonyms
- Agaricus crocatus Schrad. (1794)

= Mycena crocata =

Species of fungus

Mycena crocata Mycological characteristics
- Gills on hymenium
- Cap is conical
- Hymenium is adnate
- Stipe is bare
- Spore print is white
- Ecology is saprotrophic
- Edibility is unknown

Mycena crocata is a species of agaric fungus in the family Mycenaceae. The common name saffrondrop bonnet refers to the red or orange latex that it exudes if the stipe is broken. Its habitat is woody debris and leaf litter in deciduous woodland, especially beech.
