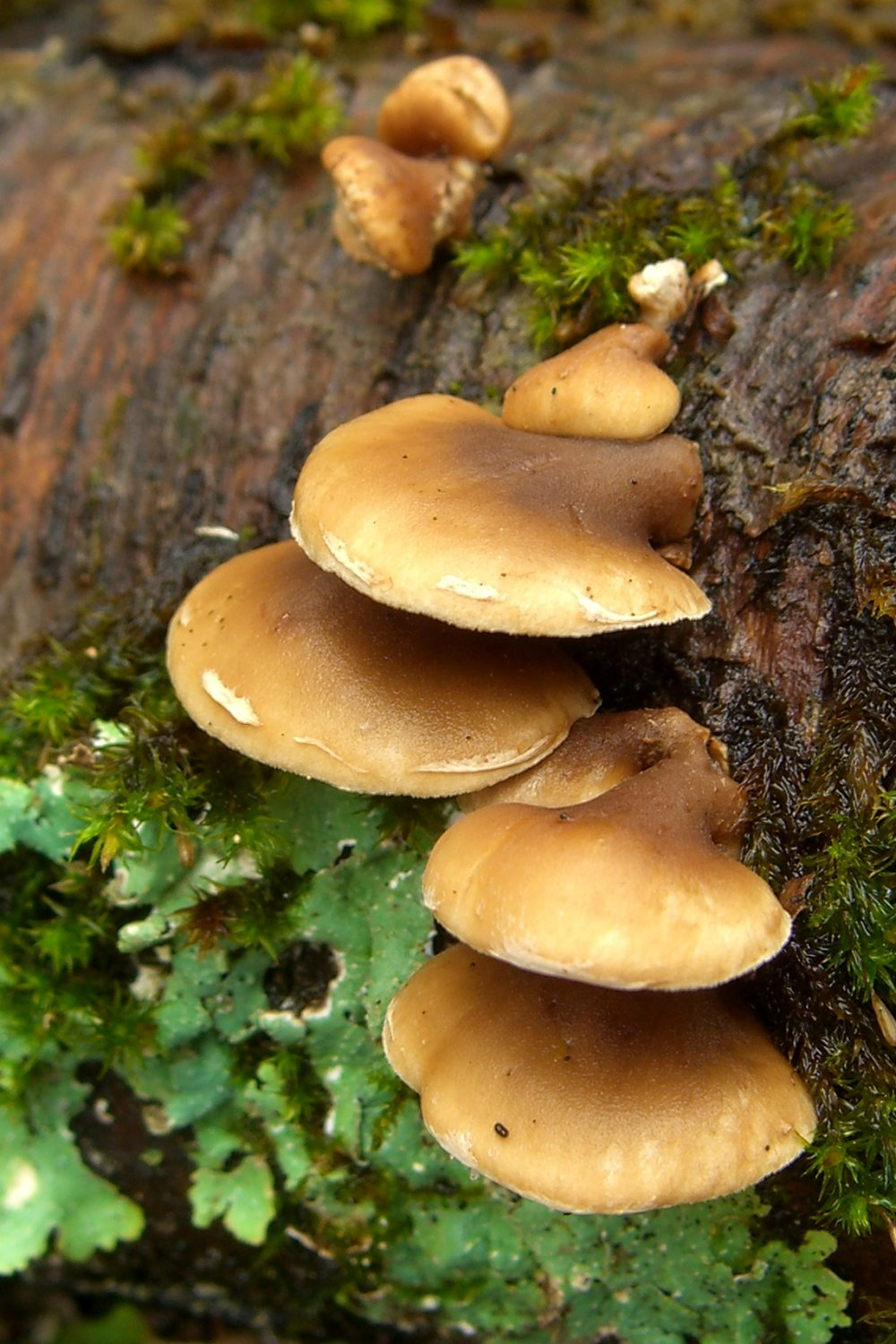
- Tectella patellaris

Scientific classification
- Kingdom: Fungi
- Division: Basidiomycota
- Class: Agaricomycetes
- Order: Agaricales
- Family: Mycenaceae
- Genus: Tectella; Earle

Type species
- Tectella patellaris (Berk. & M.A. Curtis) Earle

Species
- Tectella luteohinnulea Tectella patellaris Tectella phellodendri

= Tectella =

Genus of fungi

Tectella is a genus of fungi in the family Mycenaceae. The genus is widely distributed in northern temperate regions, and contains three species.
