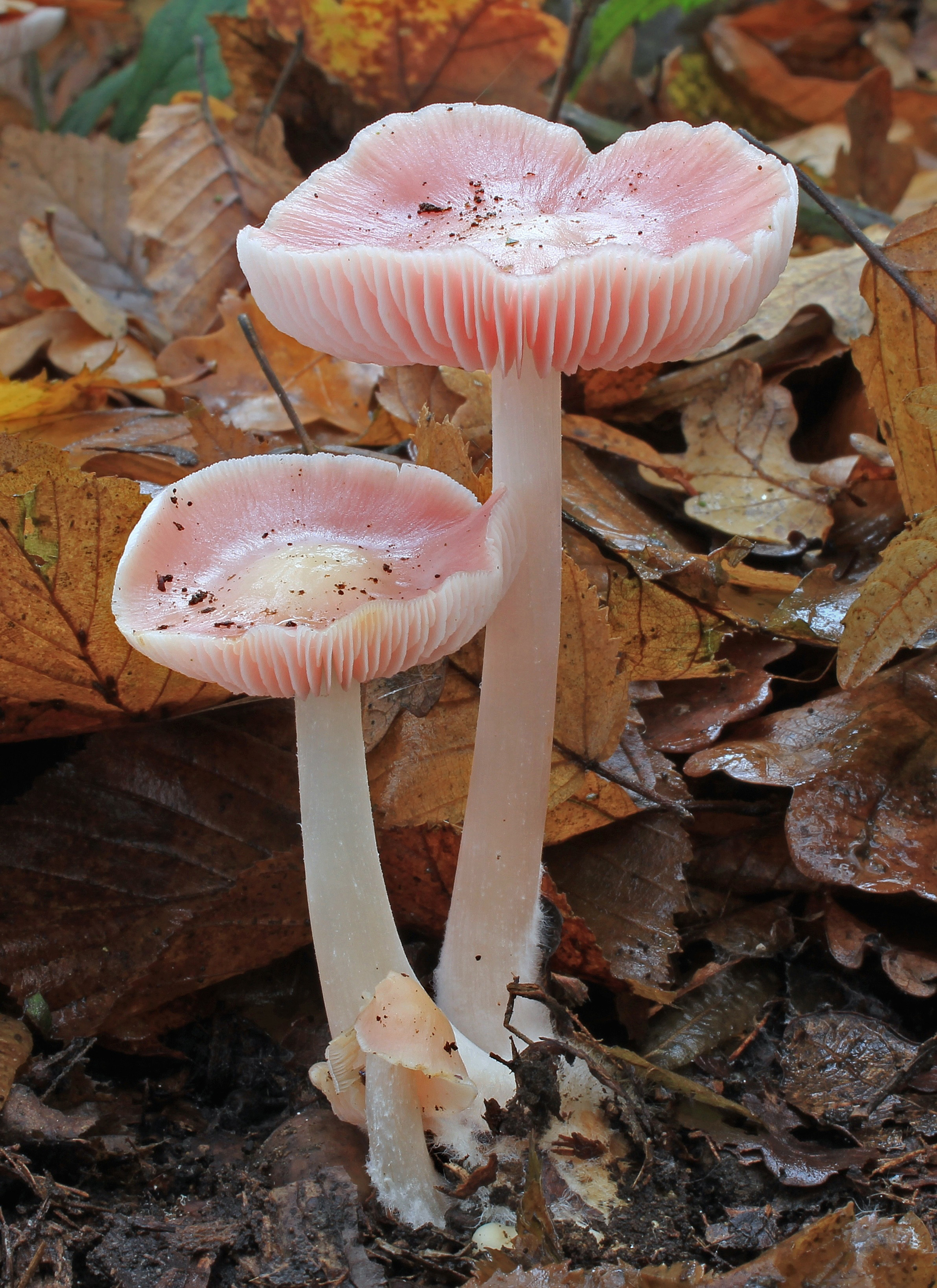

Scientific classification
- Domain: Eukaryota
- Kingdom: Fungi
- Division: Basidiomycota
- Class: Agaricomycetes
- Order: Agaricales
- Family: Mycenaceae
- Genus: Mycena
- Species: M. rosea

Binomial name
- Mycena rosea (Schumach.) Gramberg

Synonyms
- Agaricus roseus Schumach. Mycena pura f. rosea (Schumach.) J.E. Lange; Mycena pura var. rosea (Schumach.) J.E. Lange

= Mycena rosea =

Species of fungus

Mycena rosea Mycological characteristics
- Gills on hymenium
- Cap is conical
- Hymenium is adnate
- Stipe is bare
- Spore print is white
- Ecology is saprotrophic
- Edibility is poisonous

Mycena rosea, commonly known as the rosy bonnet, is a species of bioluminescent mushroom in the family Mycenaceae. First named Agaricus roseus in 1803 by Danish botanist Heinrich Christian Friedrich Schumacher, it was given its present name in 1912 by Gramberg.

== Description ==
The cap initially has a convex shape before flattening; its diameter may reach up to 6 cm (2.4 in).

=== Similar species ===
Mycena sororius is a closely related species that has been reliably distinguished from M. rosea by the electrophoretic migration of isozymes, as well as having larger spores—7.5–8.5 to 10 by 4.8–5.5 μm, compared to 6.5–9 by 4.5–5 μm for M. rosea.

== Bioactive compounds ==
The fruit bodies of Mycena rosea contain two red alkaloid pigments that are unique to this species. Named mycenarubin A, and mycenarubin B, these chemicals are related to the so-called damirones that are found in marine sponges.

== See also ==
- List of bioluminescent fungi
