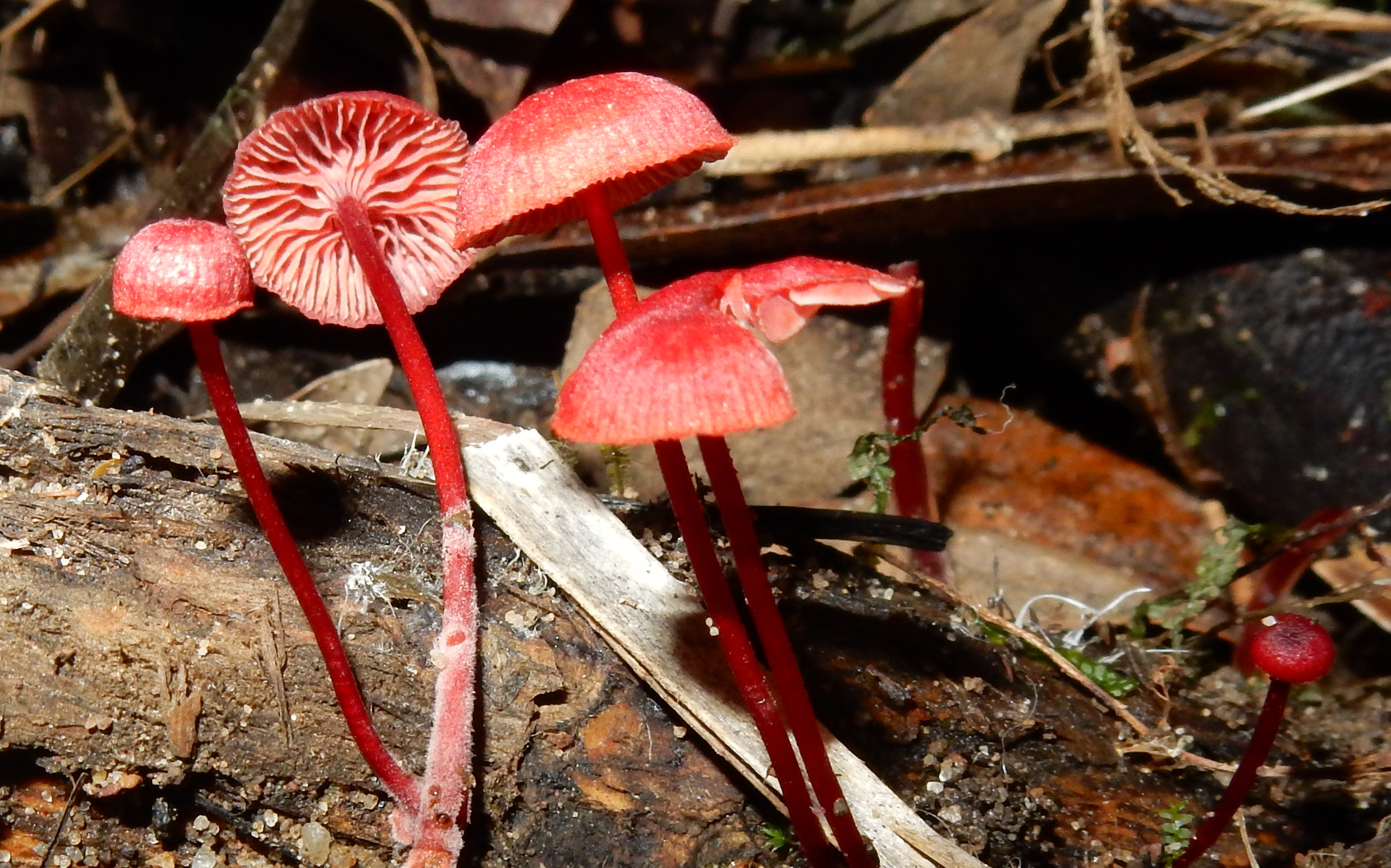
- Ferndale Park, Australia

Scientific classification
- Kingdom: Fungi
- Division: Basidiomycota
- Class: Agaricomycetes
- Order: Agaricales
- Family: Mycenaceae
- Genus: Cruentomycena
- Species: C. viscidocruenta

Binomial name
- Cruentomycena viscidocruenta (Cleland) R.H. Petersen & Kovalenko 2008 (1924)

Synonyms
- Mycena viscidocruenta; Mycena coccinea Cleland & Cheel [as 'coccineus'] 1919

= Cruentomycena viscidocruenta =

Ruby bonnet

Species of fungus

Cruentomycena viscidocruenta, commonly known as the ruby bonnet, is a species of agaric fungus in the family Mycenaceae. It is found in moist forested areas of Australia and New Zealand, often in small groups on rotting wood. Care in identification needs to be made to distinguish the ruby bonnet from red forms of Hygrocybe mushrooms.
