= Neonothopanus =

Scientific classification
- Kingdom: Fungi
- Division: Basidiomycota
- Class: Agaricomycetes
- Order: Agaricales
- Family: Omphalotaceae
- Genus: Neonothopanus; R.H.Petersen & Krisai (1999)

Type species
- Neonothopanus nambi (Speg.) R.H.Petersen & Krisai (1999)

Species
- N. gardneri N. hygrophanus N. nambi

Genus of fungi

Neonothopanus is a genus of three species of fungi in the agaric family Omphalotaceae. The genus was circumscribed in 1999. The type species N. nambi is found in Australia, South America, Central America, and Malaysia, while N. gardneri is found in South America. Both of these species are bioluminescent. N. hygrophanus, found in central Africa, was added to the genus in 2011.

== See also ==
- List of Marasmiaceae genera
