= Bérubé =

Bérubé is a Norman and French-Canadian surname, sometimes anglicized as Berube:

- Allan Bérubé (1946–2007), American historian, researcher and activist
- Carla Berube, American basketball coach
- Connie Berube Binsfeld (1924–2014), American politician from Michigan
- Craig Berube (born 1965), Canadian ice hockey coach
- David M. Berube (born 1953), American science communication scholar and researcher
- Georgette Berube (1927–2005), American politician
- Jacquelynn Berube (born 1971), American weightlifter
- Jean-François Bérubé (born 1991), Canadian ice hockey player
- Jessica Bérubé (born 1992), Canadian baseball player
- Jocelyn Bérubé (born 1946), Canadian actor, musician and storyteller
- Joseph Bérubé, Canadian politician from New Brunswick
- Léo Bérubé (1884–1967), Canadian lawyer and politician
- Liz Berube (1943–2021), American comic book artist
- Michael Bérubé (born 1961), American professor and author
- Michelle Berube (born 1966), American actress and gymnast
- Pascal Bérubé (born 1975), Canadian politician
- Philippe Berubé (born 1983), Canadian snowboarder
- Raphaël Bérubé, Canadian rapper known as Sir Pathétik
- Roger Berube (born 1938), American politician
- Ryan Berube (born 1973), American swimmer
- Sandrine Bérubé (born 1999), Canadian wheelchair basketball player
- Sylvie Bérubé, Canadian politician
- Yves Bérubé (1940–1993), Québécois engineer and politician

== See also ==
- Berube Lake in northeastern Ontario, Canada
