= Neonothopanus nambi =

Scientific classification
- Kingdom: Fungi
- Division: Basidiomycota
- Class: Agaricomycetes
- Order: Agaricales
- Family: Omphalotaceae
- Genus: Neonothopanus
- Species: N. nambi

Binomial name
- Neonothopanus nambi (Speg.) R.H. Petersen & Krisai, 1999

Synonyms
- Agaricus nambi Speg., 1883; Pleurotus nambi (Speg.) Speg., 1887

Species of fungus

Neonothopanus nambi is a poisonous and bioluminescent mushroom in the family Omphalotaceae. The genetic and molecular mechanisms underlying this species' bioluminescence were published in 2019, the first to be elucidated for a fungus. In 2020, genes from this fungus were used to create bioluminescent tobacco plants.

Italian-Argentinian naturalist Carlo Luigi Spegazzini described the species in 1883 as Agaricus nambí in the subgenus Pleurotus, from material collected in December 1879 near Guarapí, a locality in Yaguarón, Paraguarí Department, Paraguay. Pier Andrea Saccardo placed it in the genus Pleurotus. Ronald H. Petersen and Irmgard Krisai placed the fungus in the new genus Neonothopanus in 1999.
