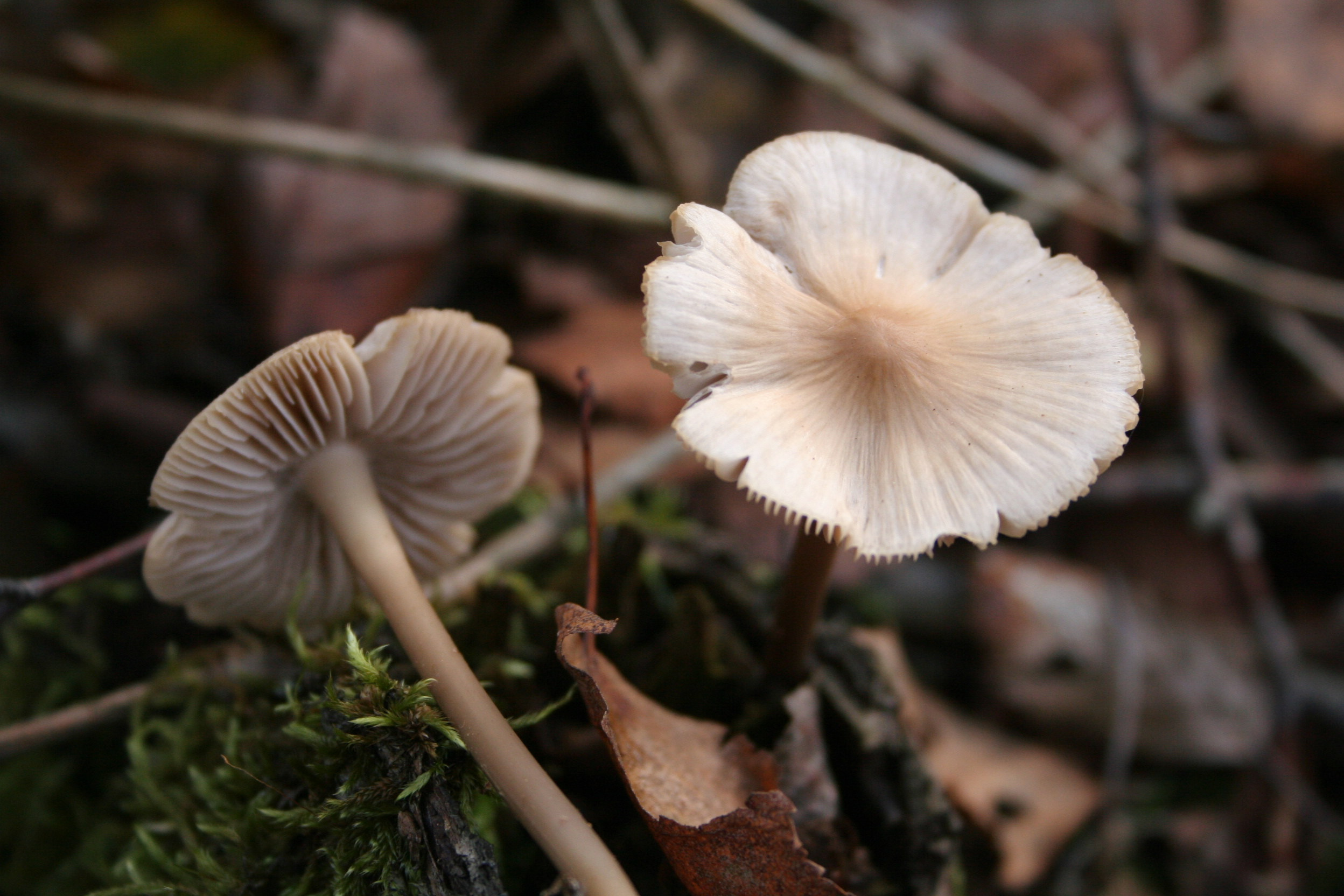
- Mycena galericulata

Scientific classification
- Kingdom: Fungi
- Division: Basidiomycota
- Class: Agaricomycetes
- Order: Agaricales
- Family: Mycenaceae; Overeem (1926)

Type genus
- Mycena (Pers.) Roussel (1806)

Genera
- Decapitatus; Favolaschia; Flabellimycena; Hemimycena; Mycena; Panellus; †Protomycena; Resinomycena; Roridomyces; Scytinotus; Tectella; Xeromphalina

= Mycenaceae =

Mycenaceae Temporal range: Burdigalian–recent

Family of fungi

The Mycenaceae are a family of fungi in the order Agaricales. According to the Dictionary of the Fungi (10th edition, 2008), the family contains 10 genera and 705 species. This is one of several families that were separated from the Tricholomataceae as a result of phylogenetic analyses. Taxa in the Mycenaceae are saprobic, have a cosmopolitan distribution, and are found in almost all ecological zones. The family was circumscribed by Caspar van Overeem in 1926.

The extinct genus Protomycena, described from Burdigalian age Dominican amber found on the island of Hispaniola is one of four known agaric genera in the fossil record.

== Phylogeny ==
- - - Roridomyces rorida
    - Cotobrusia calostomoides
  - - - Mycena leaiana
      - Mycena clavicularis
    - Mycena inclinata
  - Mycena insignis
  - - - Mycena viscidocruenta
      - - - Resinomycena acadiensis
          - - Dictyopanus pusillus
            - Dictyopanus spp.
        - Panellus stipticus
    - Resinomycena rhododendri
  - cf. Poromycena
  - - - Favolaschia cinnabarina
      - - Favolaschia calocera
        - Favolaschia cf. sprucei
    - - - - Poromycena sp.
          - Poromycena gracilis
        - Poromycena manipularis
      - Mycenoporella griseipora
  - - Prunulus rutilantiformis
    - Prunulus pura
  - Mycena galericulata

Phylogeny of the Mycenaceae based on nuclear large ribosomal subunit gene sequences.

A large-scale phylogenetic analysis study of the Agaricales published by a consortium of mycologists in 2002 adopted the name Mycenaceae for a strongly supported clade consisting of Dictyopanus, Favolaschia, Mycena, Mycenoporella, Prunulus, Panellus, Poromycena, and Resinomycena. Dictyopanus has since been wrapped into Panellus, and both Poromycena and Prunulus into Mycena.

== See also ==
- List of Agaricales families
