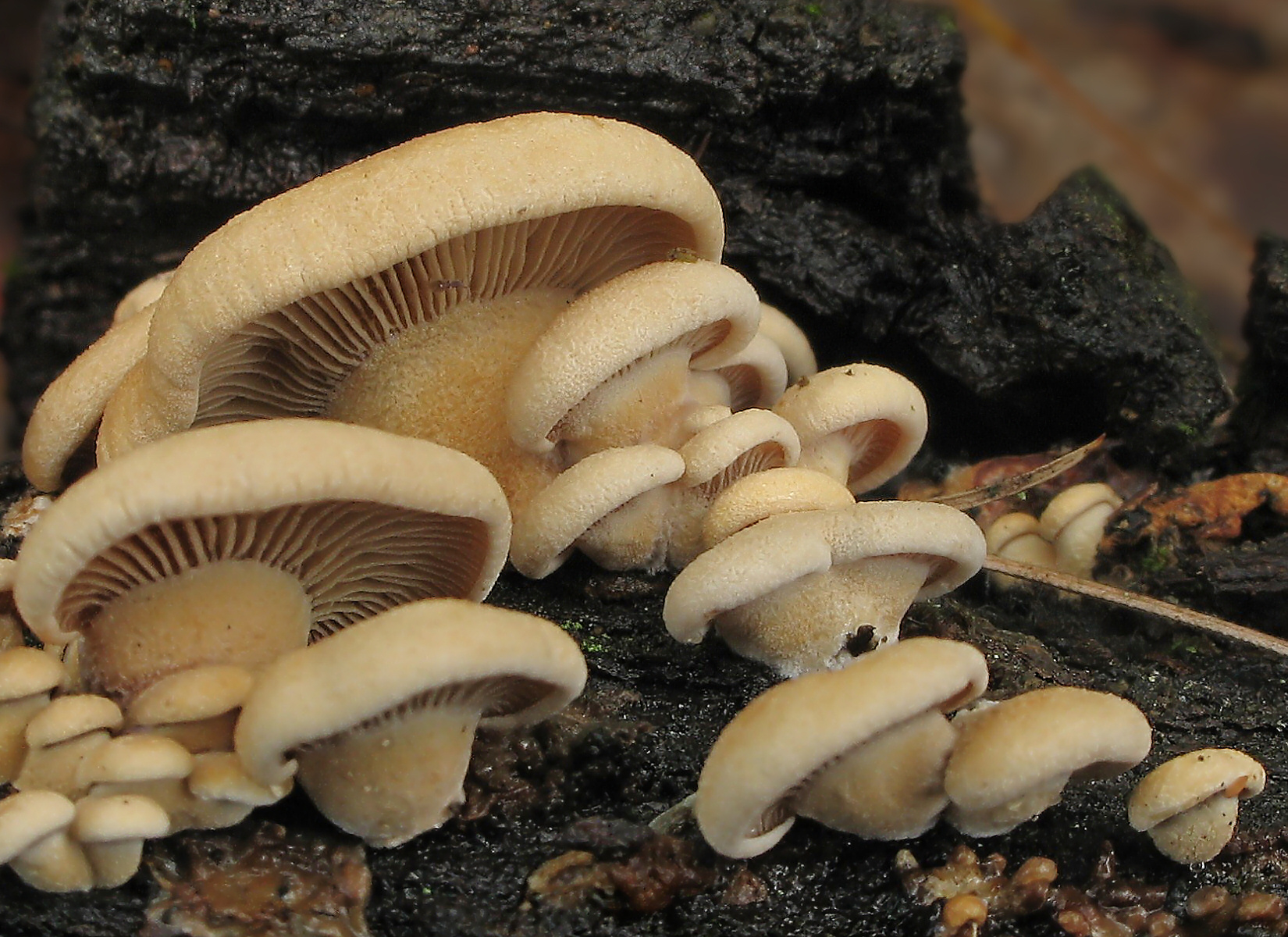
- Panellus stipticus

Scientific classification
- Kingdom: Fungi
- Division: Basidiomycota
- Class: Agaricomycetes
- Order: Agaricales
- Family: Mycenaceae
- Genus: Panellus; P.Karst.

Type species
- Panellus stipticus (Bull.:Fr.) P.Karst.

Synonyms
- Dictyopanus Pat. (1900)

= Panellus =

Genus of fungi

Panellus is a genus of fungi in the family Mycenaceae. The species are small to medium, typically pleurotoid and sometimes bioluminescent.

== Taxonomy ==
There are more than 50 species in the genus as defined molecularly. Prior to molecular analyses the generic name had been used for any white-spored pleurotoid with amyloid spores. Unrelated but similar species are now classified in Sarcomyxa and Scytinotus. In older guides and other literature the type species had been placed in either Pleurotus or Panus and the poroid species had been classified in the synonymous genus Dictyopanus or in broadly defined genera like Polyporus (Polyporaceae) or the more closely allied Favolaschia (Mycenaceae). The closest molecular allies are Resinomycena and Cruentomycena.

== Description ==
The fruit bodies of Panellus species are small- or medium-sized and in most cases pleurotoid, meaning they grow on wood, have gills (some species have pores instead of gills), and usually form semicircular or kidney-shaped caps that may be either directly attached to the wood, or connected by short stipes. The stipe is usually connected to the side of the cap, or off-center. The gills on the underside of the cap usually radiate outward from the attachment point, or may be strongly interveined to form a reticulum. The spores are hyaline (white in deposit), thin-walled, smooth and amyloid. Panellus is one of several genera in the Mycenaceae that are bioluminescent.

== Species ==
- Panellus albifavolus
- Panellus alutaceus
- Panellus ambiguus
- Panellus aureofactus
- Panellus bambusarum
- Panellus bambusifavolus
- Panellus belangeri
- Panellus brunneifavolus
- Panellus brunneomaculatus
- Panellus crawfordiae
- Panellus cremeus
- Panellus cystidiatus
- Panellus dichotomus
- Panellus diversipes
- Panellus dumontii
- Panellus exiguus
- Panellus flabellatus
- Panellus fulgens
- Panellus fuscatus
- Panellus globisporus
- Panellus glutinosus
- Panellus haematopus
- Panellus hispidifavolus
- Panellus intermedius
- Panellus jalapensis
- Panellus longinquus
- Panellus luminescens
- Panellus luteolus
- Panellus luteus
- Panellus luxfilamentus
- Panellus magnus
- Panellus megalosporus
- Panellus melleo-ochraceus
- Panellus microsporus
- Panellus minimus
- Panellus minusculus
- Panellus mitis
- Panellus niger
- Panellus nubigenus
- Panellus olivaceus
- Panellus orientalis
- Panellus parvulus
- Panellus pauciporus
- Panellus pendens
- Panellus pteridophytorum
- Panellus pubescens
- Panellus pusillus
- Panellus pyrulifer
- Panellus reticulatovenosus
- Panellus ringens
- Panellus rupicola
- Panellus serotinus
- Panellus stenocystis
- Panellus stipticus
- Panellus subcantharelloides
- Panellus sublamelliformis
- Panellus sublevatus
- Panellus violaceofulvus
