= Pleurotus novae-zelandiae =

Scientific classification
- Domain: Eukaryota
- Kingdom: Fungi
- Division: Basidiomycota
- Class: Agaricomycetes
- Order: Agaricales
- Family: Pleurotaceae
- Genus: Pleurotus
- Species: P. novae-zelandiae

Binomial name
- Pleurotus novae-zelandiae (Berk.) Sacc., 1887

Species of fungus

Pleurotus novae-zelandiae is a species of fungus in the genus Pleurotus first described by Miles Joseph Berkeley in 1855, endemic to New Zealand.

== Description ==
=== General ===
- The cap is hygrophanous, subgelatinous, white, fan-shaped, reniform, 6–8 cm. broad, 3–4 cm. long;
- The stem is obsolete but the mushroom is attached by a narrowed base which forms a little round disc,
- The gills are broad, distant, thin, interstices veiny.

Neither Greta Stevenson (1964) nor Egon Horak (1971) could trace material of P. novae-zelandiae, and according to Barbara P. Segedin its description by Berkeley from 1855 would indicate it to be a species of Marasmiellus or Resupinatus. Nevertheless, it is still an accepted species.

=== Distribution, habitat and ecology ===
This mushroom is saprobic on dead wood, present on North Island, of New Zealand.
