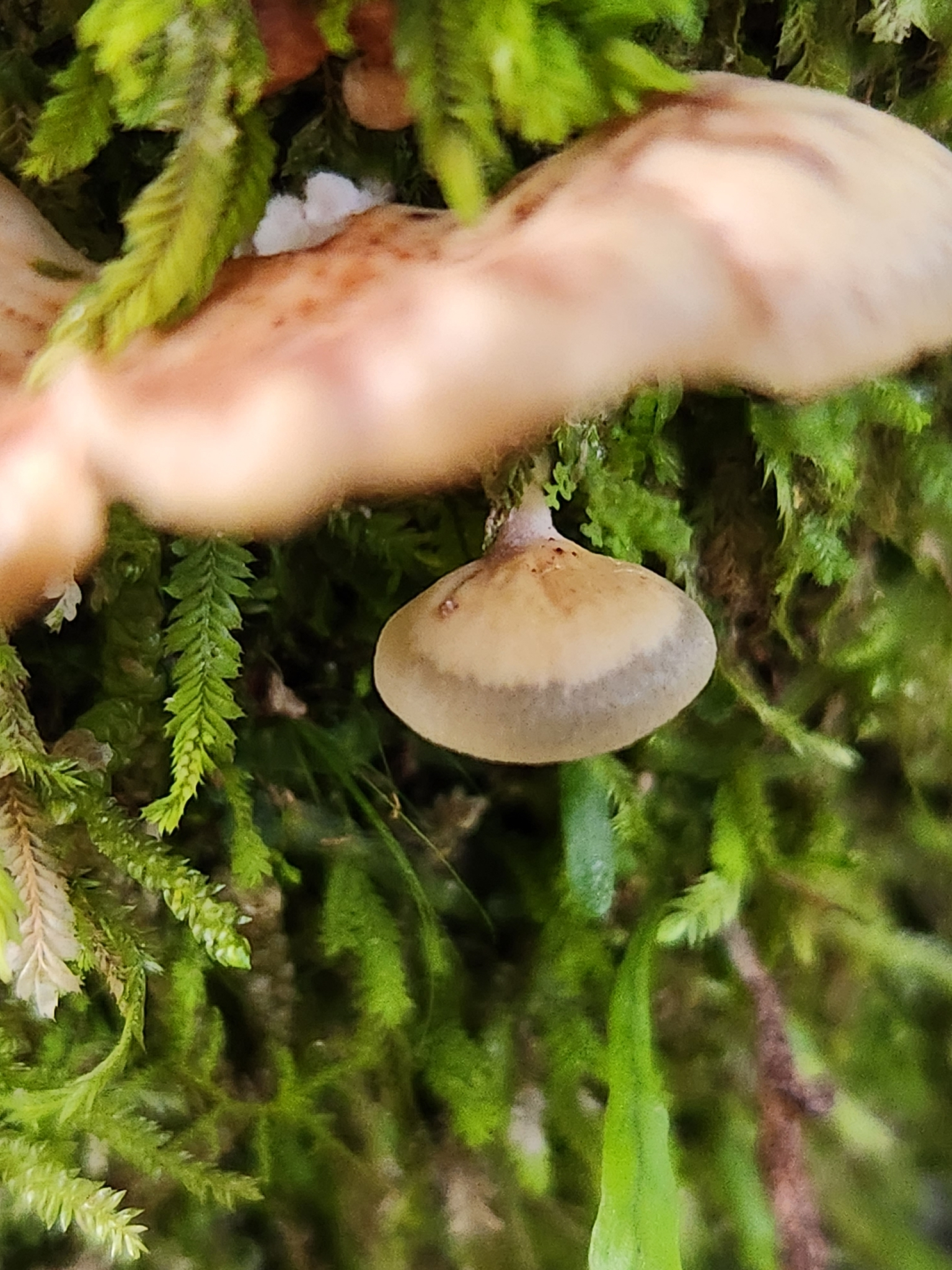

Scientific classification
- Kingdom: Fungi
- Division: Basidiomycota
- Class: Agaricomycetes
- Order: Agaricales
- Family: Mycenaceae
- Genus: Panellus
- Species: P. longinquus

Binomial name
- Panellus longinquus (Berk.) Singer

Synonyms
- Agaricus longinquus Berk.; Panellus longinquus subsp. pacificus Lib.-Barnes & Redhead; Panellus longinquus var. pacificus (Lib.-Barnes & Redhead) Blanco-Dios; Pleurotopsis longinqua (Berk.) E.Horak; Pleurotus longinquus (Berk.) Sacc.; Scytinotus longinquus (Berk.) Thorn

= Panellus longinquus =

Species of fungus

Panellus longinquus is a saprotrophic fungus in the family Porotheleaceae, known for its delicate, pink to grey fruiting bodies. It grows on decaying wood in temperate forests and is distributed across the Southern Hemisphere and parts of North America.

== Taxonomy ==
The species was first described as Agaricus longinquus by Miles Joseph Berkeley in 1847. It has since undergone several taxonomic revisions, including placements in the genera Panellus and Pleurotopsis. In 2012, it was reclassified into the genus Scytinotus, before returning to Panellus.

== Description ==
The fruiting bodies of Panellus longinquus are small and delicate, with caps ranging from 30–50 mm (1.2–2.0 inches) in width. The coloration varies from grey to pink as the mushroom ages. Its gelatinous texture suggests an adaptation to moist environments, which are characteristic of its native habitats. The stipe is short and stout, with a velvety to fibrillose surface. The pileus is cream to pale orange-brown, typically growing on the underside of decaying logs. The gills are decurrent, translucent, and widely spaced. Spores are white, smooth, and amyloid, measuring approximately 6.5–9.4 × 3.3–4.5 μm. The spore print is dingy yellowish-cream.

== Habitat and distribution ==
Panellus longinquus is found in temperate forests, growing on decaying wood. It has been recorded in New Zealand, Australia, Chile, Argentina, and parts of North America including British Columbia and Minnesota.

In New Zealand, it is considered indigenous but not endemic.

== Ecology ==
As a saprotrophic fungus, Panellus longinquus plays a role in decomposing dead wood, contributing to nutrient cycling in forest ecosystems.
