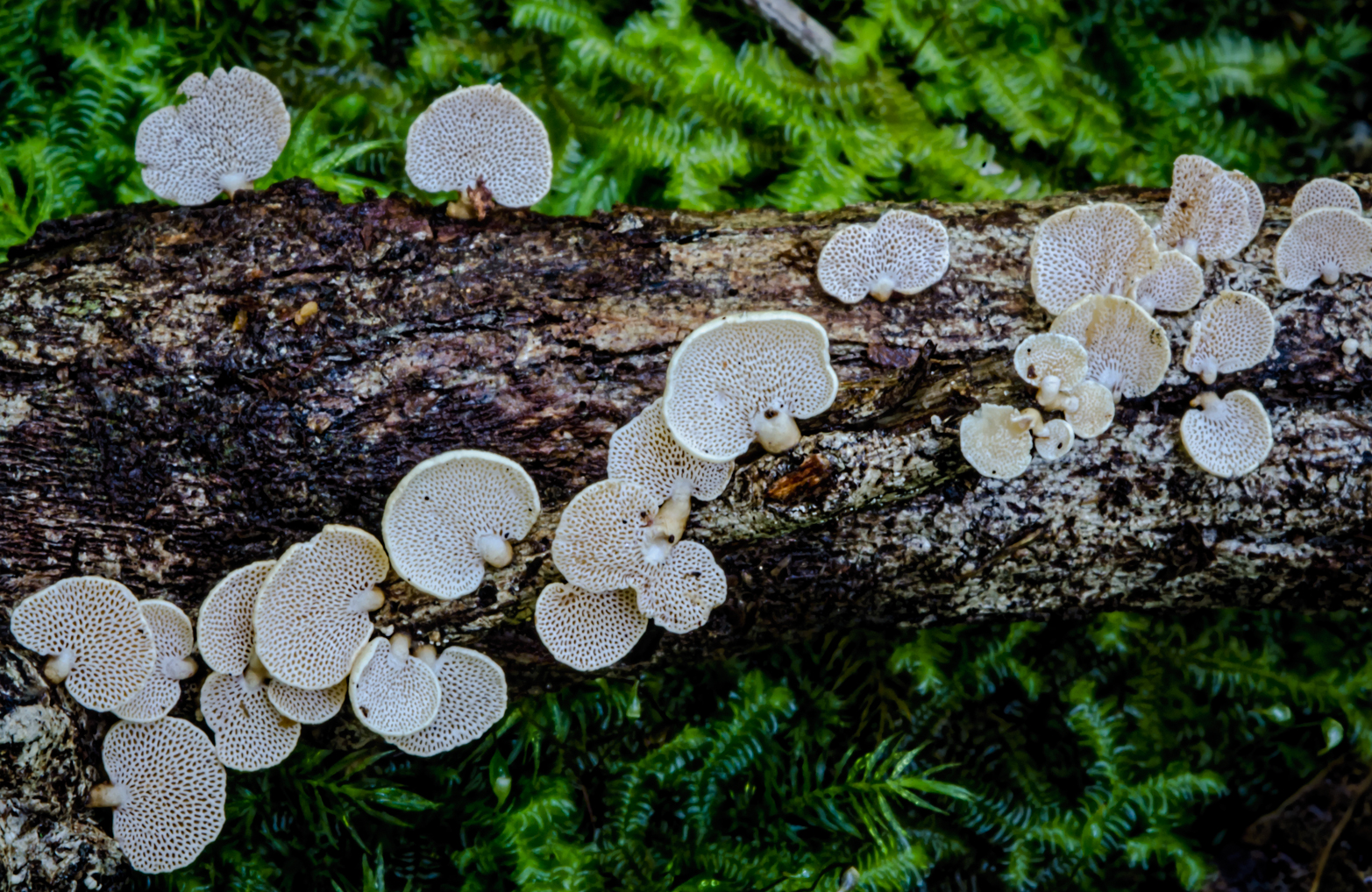

Scientific classification
- Kingdom: Fungi
- Division: Basidiomycota
- Class: Agaricomycetes
- Order: Agaricales
- Family: Mycenaceae
- Genus: Panellus
- Species: P. pusillus

Binomial name
- Panellus pusillus (Pers. ex Lév.) Burds. & O.K.Mill. (1975)

Synonyms
- Gloeoporus pusillus Pers. ex Lév. (1844); Favolus rhipidum var. pusillus Bull.(1943); Dictyopanus pusillus (Pers. ex Lév.) Singer (1945)

= Panellus pusillus =

Species of fungus

Panellus pusillus is a species of fungus in the family Mycenaceae. A widely distributed species, it has been recorded in Australia, Asia, Europe, North America, and South America. The fungus was first given its current name in 1975, but has been known by many names since French physician and mycologist Joseph-Henri Léveillé first described it as Gloeoporus pusillus in 1844. A recent molecular phylogenetic study explored the diversity and phylogeny of Panellus, and used species like P. pusillus to identify five new poroid species from China in the genus.

The mushroom develops into flat and broadly round fan- or kidney-shaped caps that measure up to 16 mm broad. The caps go from white to buffish color, and attached to decaying by short stubby stalks that are connected off-center, giving the mushroom it's fan look. Its luminosity has been known for more than half a century and is observable in the fruiting body as well as mycelia both in the wild and in laboratory cultures. The glow is rather weak and requires time to adjust to the dark to be able to notice it, and it isn't often photographed.

It is a common and widely distributed species, often found growing in dense groups or clusters on decaying wood. Modern research has probed the potential of P. pusillus as an alternative tool in lignocellulose pretreatment because of its enzymatic ability in delignification.

Panellus pusillus
- Mycological characteristics
- Pores on hymenium
- Cap is convex
- Hymenium attachment is not applicable
- Stipe is bare
- Spore print is white
- Ecology is saprotrophic
- Edibility is poisonous

== Taxonomy & Phylogeny ==
The species was first described as Gloeoporus pusillus by French physician and mycologist Joseph-Henri Léveillé in 1844, which was published in a book that same year under the following description:

Glæoporus pusillus, Pers. Mss. Pileo carnoso-lento dimi-diato conchato nudo azono stipiteque brevi laterali horizontali saturninis, poris subtetragonis flavo-carneis, dissepimentis obtusis. — Hab. in Hispaniola, ad truncos.

Which roughly translates to:

Glæoporus pusillus, Pers. Mss. Cap fleshy-slender, half-conical, bare, with a short horizontal lateral stem, saturnine, with subtetragonal yellow-fleshy pores, with obtuse dissepiments. — Habitat in Hispaniola, on trunks.

The species has had an extensive taxonomic history and been shuffled to a number of genera by various authors, resulting in several synonyms: Dictyopanus pusillus (Lloydia Singer 1945), Favolus pusillus var. pallidus (MJ Berkeley 1839), Favolus rhipidium var. pusillus (Imazeki, Bull 1943), Polyporus rhipidium (M. J. Berkeley, 1847), Laschia guaranitica (Speg. 1884), and Polyporus pusillus (Lloyd 1924). It was American mycologists Harold H. Jr. Burdsall and Orson K. Jr. Miller who in 1975 assigned its current name. Dictyopanus pusillus was commonly used in literature as a variant spelling.

The taxonomic history of Panellus is somewhat ambiguous. In previous studies, the hymenophore structure was considered as an important taxonomic feature on generic level. Later, taxonomists found some intermediate species, such as Panellus pusillus and Panellus intermedius with poroid to lamellate hymenophore. Accordingly, Burdsall and Miller (1975) treated Dictyopanus Pat., a poroid mushroom and a subgenus of Panellus, and all species of Dictyopanus transferred to Panellus. Qiu-Yue Zhang and others explored the diversity and phylogeny of Panellus, and using species like P. pusillus, identified and confirmed five new poroid species of the genus.

The fungus is commonly known as the little ping-pong bat. The specific epithet pusillus refers to its size, meaning "very small". In Japan, it's called Hinano-uchiwa meaning "princess fan" due to its shape.

== Morphology ==
The mushroom is quite small and easy to miss in the daytime, with the widest cap reaching 16 mm. Supporting the cap is a stipe that is up to 6 mm long, 1–2 mm thick, with the base enlarged downward or nearly equal, finely pubescent, and is colored like the cap. The stipe can be eccentric or laterally attached to the cap.

The cap itself is convex, semicircular to kidney- or fan-shaped (looks like a pong paddle, hence the name). The upper surface is white to whitish when young, soon becoming pinkish buff to pale salmon. It can be moist or dry, glabrous or finely pubescent, smooth or finely wrinkled, and sometimes with one or two very shallow concentric furrows. The fertile surface goes from whitish to pale pinkish buff. The margin is incurved, sometimes sulcate or splitting. The pores are angular, somewhat radially aligned, about 2-5 per mm of the fertile surface, and the tubes can run up to 1 mm deep.

The flesh is up to 2 mm thick, firm and white, with a nondistinctive odor and taste. Panellus pusillus is reported as toxic in North Mexico according to a book, though there hasn't been many studies done on its potential toxicity.

=== Similar species ===
The relatives within Panellus genus such as P. stipticus appear very similar. Both have white spore prints and similar cap morphology, except P. stipticus has gills instead of pores and has a stronger bioluminescent glow. Very closely genetically related to members of Mycena genus.

Phylogenetically, samples of P. alpinus (Dai 23597 and Dai 23601) formed an independent lineage and were related to P. pusillus. Morphologically, P. alpinus, P. hispidifavolus, P. luxfilamentus, and P. pusillus share chalky basidiocarps when dry and similar basidiospores (oblong ellipsoid to cylindrical, less than 6 μm in length).

There is some discussion as to the real identity of Australian Panellus cf pusillus. Chew et al. (2015) discussed earlier authors' concerns about morphological anomalies in old world P. pusillus. Their own morphological and molecular analyses led them to distinguish their Malaysian specimens from Florida and Louisiana material, describing their form as P. luxfilamentus. Without explaining their reasoning, they stated, "Panellus luxfilamentus has been commonly misidentified as Panellus pusillus in Asia, Australia and New Zealand" (p. 185). Whether the Tasmanian form is the same as those found on the mainland, and conspecific with the Malaysian form, is unclear.

P. pusillus is tetrapolar like its lamellate analog P. stipticus, though it is unknown if all forms of this species are compatible or if intercontinental populations are intercompatible.

== Ecology ==
P. pusillus has been on almost every continent except Africa and Antarctica. It is distributed mostly in Florida where it receives a lot of humidity, often growing in dense groups and overlapping clusters on decaying broadleaves in the shade. In other words, it prefers to grow in the tropics and subtropics. (Wassink 1979) It tends to favor hardwoods, but it has been reported growing on rotten culm of bamboo, eucalyptus, and even pine.

P. pusillus is a saprobic species and causes a white rot. This is a form of wood decay in which the wood assumes a bleached appearance and where lignin as well as cellulose and hemicellulose is broken down by enzymes secreted by the fungus.

== Overall Biology & Human Relevance ==
=== Japanese Folklore ===
There is a lot of folklore in Japan surrounding bioluminescent fungi (including P. pusillus). Some examples are Kitsune-bi, meaning 'fox's fire', and Mino-bi, meaning 'raincoat fire'. Both Kitsune-bi and Mino-bi are partly considered to be responsible for the luminous mycelia growing on rotten wood or the straw of Mino, and were sometimes believed to be the work of foxes. Of note, Sakyo Kanda (1874–1939), the author of the book "Shiranui, Hitodama, and Kitsune-bi", which sheds light on the mysterious luminescence, was a biologist of luminous organisms, and he considered the major cause of the Japanese foxfire to be a misinterpretation of people's lanterns.

Japanologist Katsumi Masuda theorized that P. pusillus is the one responsible for the glowing bamboo in The Tale of the Bamboo Cutter, with historian Michihisa Hotate agreeing with this hypothesis. The distribution records of P. pusillus were mainly in the southern part of Japan: Bonin Isls., Matsuyama (Ehime Prefecture), and Hachijo Isl., but also in central Japan. Shidei reported the growth of P. pusillus on bamboo in Kyoto. As the story is probably set in Kyoto, and at that time many bamboo craftworkers originating from the southern Kyushu region worked there, it can be speculated that the author of the tale had learned of the phenomenon of bamboo glowing from the craftworkers' experiences, inspiring the famous opening scene.

=== Bioluminescent history ===
In Japan, modern science started after the Meiji Revolution in 1868. Most likely, S. Kawamura was the first Japanese individual who studied the bioluminescence of fungi. In his descriptive paper of Omphalotus japonicus, he also reported the effects of nitrogen, hydrogen, and oxygen gasses on the luminosity of O. japonicus fruitbodies, showing that the luminescence did not fade when it was treated with oxygen. These results are basically the same as those using O. olearius by Fabre, as described above. Kawamura also observed that the juice squeezed out from the luminous gills had no luminosity.

Airth and McElroy detected luminescence when a hot-water extract from the mycelia of the luminous fungus Armillaria mellea and a cold-water extract from the mycelia of the luminous fungus 'Collybia velutipes' were mixed in the presence of NADH or NADPH. Airth and Foerster showed that this reaction consists of at least two steps, involving the reduction of unidentified dehydro- or oxyluciferin (luciferin precursor) by NADH or NADPH with a soluble enzyme (approximately 25 kDa) and light-emitting oxidation of luciferin by molecular oxygen with an insoluble membrane-bound enzyme. Airth and Foerster also showed that a cold-water extract from Panellus stipticus (Panus stipticus, in their paper) mycelia (luminescent strain) exhibited luminescence activity for a hot-water extract from A. mellea mycelia with NADH. Based on these results, they suggested that fungal luminescence is explained as a luciferin–luciferase reaction, and the presence of reduced pyridine nucleotides in the reaction mixture is key to reproducing the luminescence in vitro. It has been theorized that the bioluminescence serves to attract insects or other pollinators for spore dispersal, but there isn't a lot of evidence supporting this theory.

Currently, the phenomenon of fungi bioluminescence is familiar to many people in Japan. For example, there are the characters of the Pokémon Card Game, capsule toys, and picture books that focus on luminous mushrooms. TV programs featuring mushrooms often include the topics of luminescence of some mushroom species. Artificial cultivation methods of M. chlorophos have been established, and the species has been used for special exhibitions in several local museums and botanical gardens (e.g., Hachijo Visitor Center, Tokyo; Yumenoshima Tropical Greenhouse Dome, Tokyo; and Nagoya City Science Museum, Aichi). A culture kit is available online. Night-time hiking ecotours to watch glowing M. chlorophos are one of the most economically significant tour activities in Hachijo Isl. and Bonin Isls, and trips to watch glowing M. lux-coeli have occasionally been held at various localities in southern Japan, such as the Amami Islands, Mt. Yokokura, and Ukui Peninsula.

=== Other biochemistry ===
In a study looking for fungi that can help reduce waste during palm oil production, Andrés M. Rueda and others found that "a crude fungal enzymatic extract from a wild Colombian source of D. pusillus LMB4 exhibits significant laccase activity.... suggesting that an upscaling of this process could potentially help with the delignification of starting materials in cellulosic bioethanol production" (Rueda et al 2020). Essentially, the laccase (a type of fungal enzyme) from their P. pusillus sample was found to be highly active in the delignifying process, and that improvements to its enzymatic activity could prove to be more effective with the processing of leftover woody material in bioethanol production such as palm oil. They also reported that an increase in copper and glucose concentration during fermentation was beneficial in increasing P. pusillus laccase activity and improve enzyme production in the fungus (Rueda et al 2020). Furthermore, the enzymatic extract from P. pusillus retained "good ligninolytic capacity at acidic pH, in addition to demonstrating higher pH and thermal stability than the purified commercial laccase" from Trametes versicolor (Rueda et al, 2020).

=== Microscopic features ===
The spores are 4.5-6 x 2-3 μm in diameter, oblong to ellipsoid, smooth-walled, hyaline, and amyloid. It's hyphal system is monomitic, with present clamp connections. Its cystidia is 20-35 x 3-4 μm and its shape is cylindrical to lanceolate, and has cylindrical cheilocystidia 40 x 4-65 μm that's rather densely spiculose over the distal half with short, simple or sparingly branched processes 1-5 x 1-1.5 μm, sometimes shortly lobed but not digitate, and densely incrusted. The basidia is roughly 13-15 x 4.5-5 μm.
