= Filoboletus hanedae =

Scientific classification
- Domain: Eukaryota
- Kingdom: Fungi
- Division: Basidiomycota
- Class: Agaricomycetes
- Order: Agaricales
- Family: Mycenaceae
- Genus: Filoboletus
- Species: F. hanedae

Binomial name
- Filoboletus hanedae (Kobayasi) Hongo

Species of fungus

Filoboletus hanedae, is a species of agaric fungus in the family Mycenaceae native to South-East Asia, first described by George S. Kobayashi. Its fruiting bodies display bioluminescence.

== Morphology ==
=== Pileus (cap) ===
The shape of the pileus in Filoboletus hanedae displays quite a bit of variation with convex or conico-campanulate, umbonate, plane, hygrophanous caps being observed. Margin rather strongly incurved at first. The underside of the pileus has pores, rather than gills, where spores are grown and dispersed.

=== Size ===
The size of the fungus's pileus ranges from about half-a-centimeter to about three and half centimeters in diameter. The stipes (stalk) size ranges from 0.4 to 6 centimeters long.

=== Coloration ===
The coloration of Filoboletus hanedae changes depending on its maturation state. At maturity, the fruiting bodies have white or beige coloration. During maturation, however, the fruiting body - or basidiomata - can also have brown or pink coloration. The visibility of any brown or pink coloration decreases as the fruiting body matures, giving way to the more known white, yellowish and beige appearance.

=== Bioluminescence ===
The flesh is greenish phosphorescent, especially in the lower part of the stem.

== Ecology ==
Filoboletus hanedae grows on trunks, stipes and sticks in the forest, being noted in Sri Lanka, Peninsular Malaysia, Sumatra, Borneo, Krakatoa archipelago, Karimunjawa, Philippine Islands, Pohnpei, New Guinea, New Caledonia, Australia, Madagascar, Venezuela and Japan.
