= Foxfire =

Fungal bioluminescence

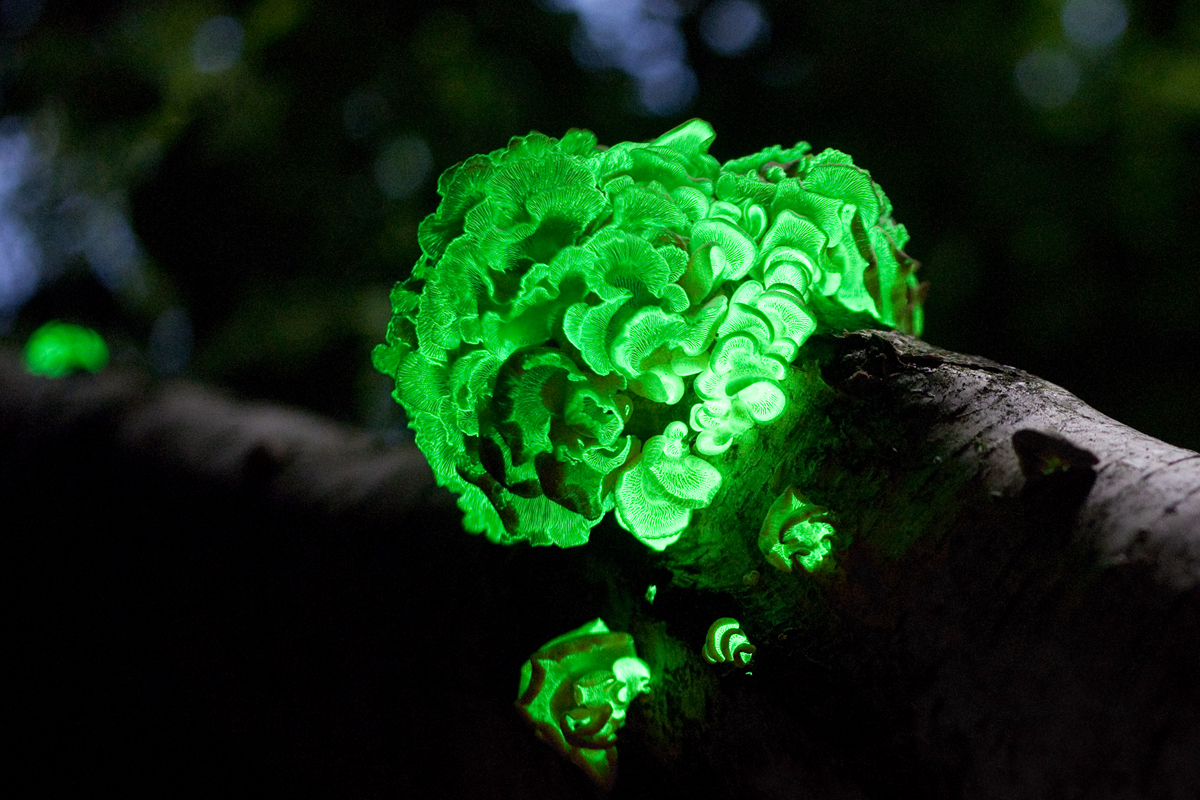
Panellus stipticus, Mt. Vernon, Wisconsin (long exposure)

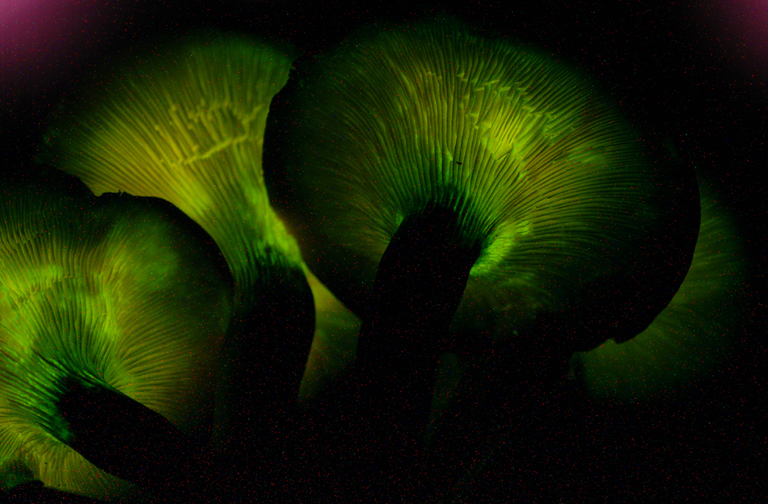
Omphalotus olearius

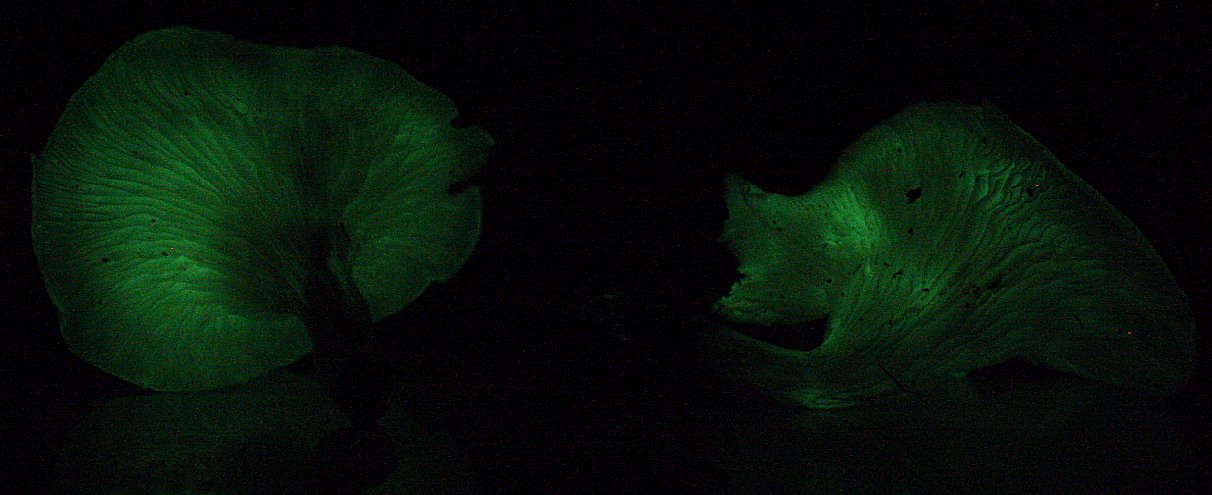
Omphalotus nidiformis, glowing in the dark

Artificial fill light contrasts against the natural glow.

Foxfire, also called fairy fire and chimpanzee fire, is the bioluminescence created by some species of fungi present in decaying wood. The bluish-green glow is attributed to a luciferase, an oxidative enzyme, which emits light as it reacts with a luciferin. The phenomenon has been known since ancient times, with its source determined in 1823.

== Description ==
Foxfire is the bioluminescence created by some species of fungi present in decaying wood. It occurs in a number of species, including Panellus stipticus, Omphalotus olearius and Omphalotus nidiformis. The bluish-green glow is attributed to luciferin, which emits light after oxidation catalyzed by the enzyme luciferase. Some believe that the light attracts insects to spread spores, or acts as a warning to hungry animals, like the bright colors exhibited by some poisonous or unpalatable animal species. Although generally very dim, in some cases foxfire is bright enough to read by.

== History ==
The oldest recorded documentation of foxfire is from 382 B.C., by Aristotle, whose notes refer to a light that, unlike fire, was cold to the touch. The Roman thinker Pliny the Elder also mentioned glowing wood in olive groves.

Foxfire was used to illuminate the needles on the barometer and the compass of Turtle, an early submarine. This is commonly thought to have been suggested by Benjamin Franklin; a reading of the correspondence from Benjamin Gale, however, shows that Benjamin Franklin was only consulted for alternative forms of lighting when the cold temperatures rendered the foxfire inactive.

After many more literary references to foxfire by early scientists and naturalists, its cause was discovered in 1823. The glow emitted from wooden support beams in mines was examined, and it was found that the luminescence came from fungal growth.

The "fox" in foxfire may derive from the Old French word faux, meaning "false", rather than from the name of the animal.

== See also ==
- Aurora Borealis, called "revontulet" (literally "foxfires") in the Finnish language
- List of bioluminescent fungi
- Will-o'-the-wisp
