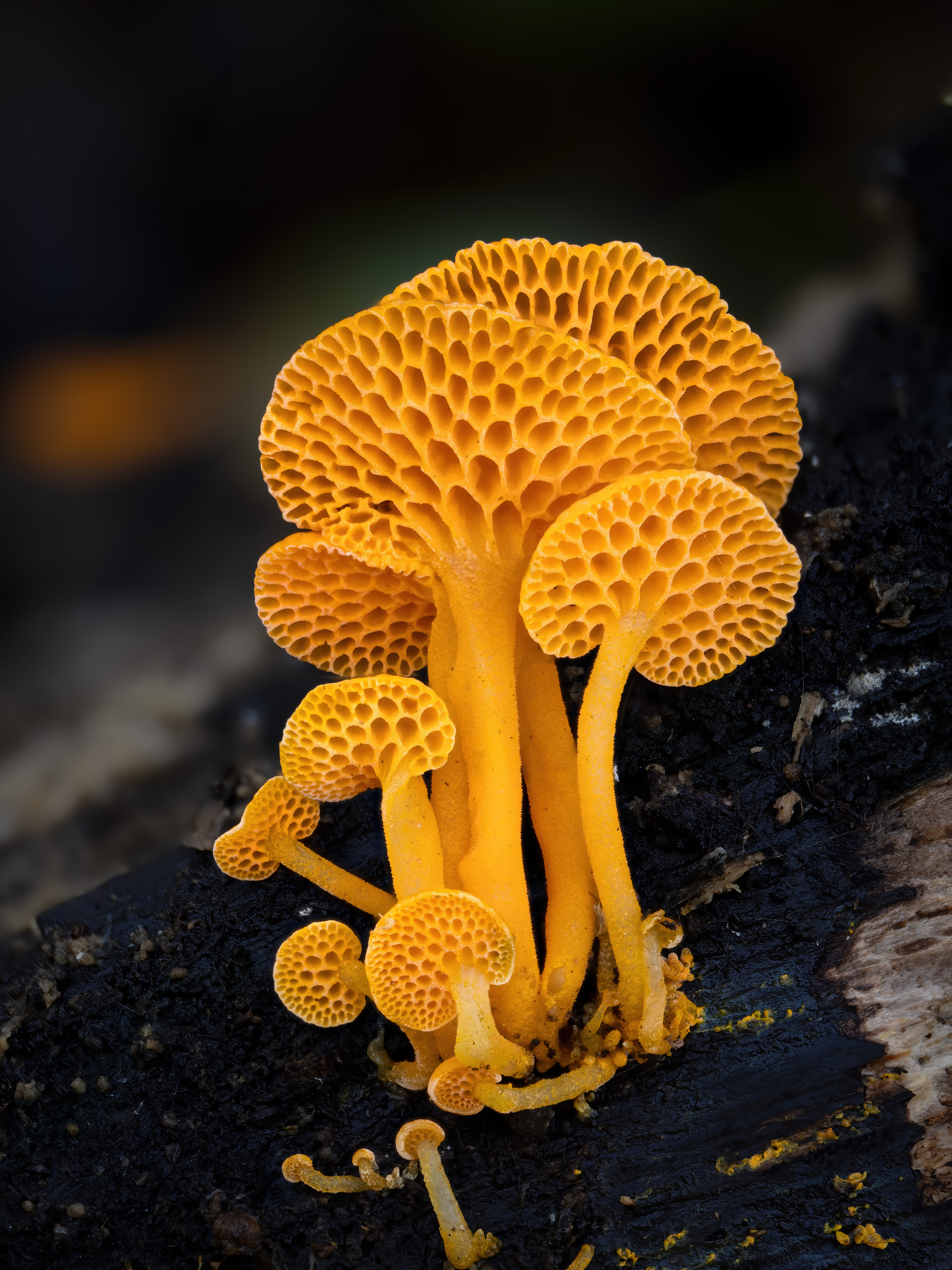
- Favolaschia calocera

Scientific classification
- Kingdom: Fungi
- Division: Basidiomycota
- Class: Agaricomycetes
- Order: Agaricales
- Family: Mycenaceae
- Genus: Favolaschia (Pat.) Pat. (1892)

Type species
- Favolaschia gaillardii (Pat.) Pat. (as 'gaillardi') (1895)

Synonyms
- Laschia sect. Favolaschia Pat. (1887); Hologloea Pat. (1900); Porolaschia Pat. (1900); Mycomedusa R.Heim (1945); Mycomedusa R.Heim ex R.Heim (1966)

= Favolaschia =

Genus of fungi

Favolaschia is a genus of fungi in the family Mycenaceae. The genus has a widespread distribution, and contains about 50 species. Like the genus Favolus, the name is derived from the Latin favus meaning honeycomb, as the fungi with the large pores on the underside are resembling a honeycomb. The name was first published as a section of the obsolete genus Laschia, which was named after Wilhelm Gottfried Lasch (1787-1863), who was a German apothecary and botanist.

== Species ==
- Favolaschia alsophilae
- Favolaschia amoene-rosea
- Favolaschia andina
- Favolaschia aulaxina
- Favolaschia aurantiaca
- Favolaschia auriscalpium
- Favolaschia austrocyatheae
- Favolaschia calamicola
- Favolaschia calocera
- Favolaschia citrina
- Favolaschia cyatheae
- Favolaschia dumontii
- Favolaschia dybowskyana
- Favolaschia echinata
- Favolaschia fendleri
- Favolaschia fujisanensis
- Favolaschia furfurella
- Favolaschia gaillardii
- Favolaschia gelatina — Japan
- Favolaschia heliconiae
- Favolaschia holtermannii
- Favolaschia intermedia
- Favolaschia lateritia
- Favolaschia mainsii
- Favolaschia manipularis
- Favolaschia meridae
- Favolaschia moelleri
- Favolaschia montana
- Favolaschia nigrostriata
- Favolaschia nipponica
- Favolaschia oligogloea
- Favolaschia oligopora
- Favolaschia pantherina
- Favolaschia papuana
- Favolaschia pegleri
- Favolaschia peziziformis
- Favolaschia pezizoidea
- Favolaschia phyllostachydis
- Favolaschia pterigena
- Favolaschia puberula
- Favolaschia puiggarii
- Favolaschia pustulosa
- Favolaschia pygmaea
- Favolaschia roseogrisea
- Favolaschia rubra
- Favolaschia sabalensis
- Favolaschia selloana
- Favolaschia singeriana
- Favolaschia sprucei
- Favolaschia subamyloidea
- Favolaschia subceracea
- Favolaschia teapae
- Favolaschia thwaitesii
- Favolaschia varariotecta
- Favolaschia violascens
- Favolaschia volkensii
- Favolaschia zenkeriana

== See also ==
- List of Agaricales genera
