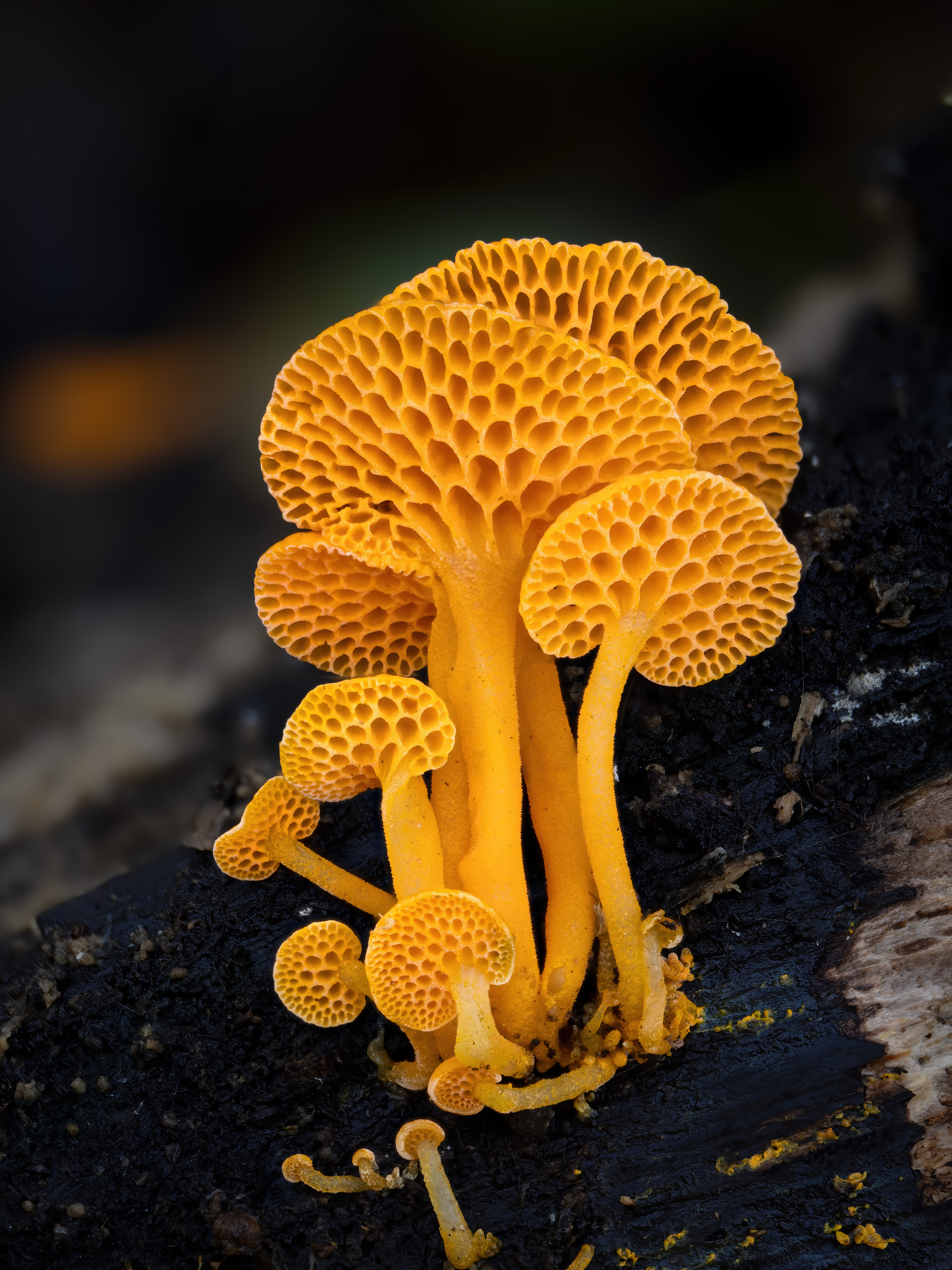

Scientific classification
- Kingdom: Fungi
- Division: Basidiomycota
- Class: Agaricomycetes
- Order: Agaricales
- Family: Mycenaceae
- Genus: Favolaschia
- Species: F. calocera

Binomial name
- Favolaschia calocera R. Heim

= Favolaschia calocera =

Species of fungus

Favolaschia calocera, commonly known as the orange pore fungus, is a species of fungus in the family Mycenaceae. Due to its form it is also known as orange pore conch or orange Ping-Pong bat. Throughout much of its expanded range F. calocera is now considered an invasive species. It colonizes ruderal sites along transport routes and can become dominant in habitats disturbed by human activity. Mycologists fear that it may be displacing native fungi species as it spreads through the paleotropics.

== Etymology ==
For the generic name, see Favolaschia. The specific epithet was chosen because the basidia and sterigmata of the species resemble those of the fungi of the genus Calocera.

== Description ==
Favolaschia calocera is a wood-inhabiting saprotrophic fungus. It often has a bright yellow color at first, and can later appear in a brownish yellow color, though it often presents as a bright orange stalked fan, 5 mm–30 mm diameter, with prominent pores on the underside.

== Geographic distribution ==
First observed in Madagascar, it is present in New Zealand since the 1950s, where it became an invasive species. It has recently spread around the world. In 1999 it was first found in Italy. The second European country where it appeared was Spain. There it was first found in 2004 near the Monte Deva, Gijon, by D. Francisco Casero, president of the Asturian Society of Mycology. In 2012 it was found in Great Britain and in 2013 it was sighted on the mainland of Portugal. It has also been found in the Azores. In 2015 it was found in France and Switzerland. In 2019 it was found in Belgium and in November 2020 it was found in the Netherlands. In 2022 it was found in Ireland and in 2023 in Northern Ireland. In September 2023 it was first recorded on the Isle of Man. And in 2015, it was also found in the Khosta Microdistrict (southwestern Russia).

Its distribution in America is not well documented, but it was collected in Ecuador, Paraguay, Colombia, Venezuela, Brazil and Peru. It is also present in Costa Rica and is widespread on the islands of Hawaii, although it had not been found there before 2009. It has recently been found in California. It is also widespread in Australia and was first collected on Norfolk Island in 1994, but in opposition to its early spreading in New Zealand it was not collected in mainland Australia until the year 2004. It was also found on the French Islands Réunion Island and Mayotte, which are located near the mainland of Africa. There it was found in Kenya, Cameroon, DR Congo, Tanzania and Zambia. Its also present on São Tomé and on the Seychelles. In Asia it was first found in Thailand and China with a high level of genetic variation between the collections. More recently, it was found in India, Nepal, Myanmar, Vietnam, the Philippines and on the island of Sumatra. It is uncertain whether F. calocera is native to Madagascar or was introduced to the island from Asia. A recent study concludes that Favolaschia calocera is a species complex and renames the samples from Madagascar as Favolaschia calocera sensu stricto; the complex also includes three new species from China (F. brevibasidiata, F. brevistipitata and F. longistipitata), the new species F. minutissima from China and Thailand, and a variety raised to species rank called Favolaschia claudopus, to which the samples from Oceania, Africa and Europe seem to belong.
