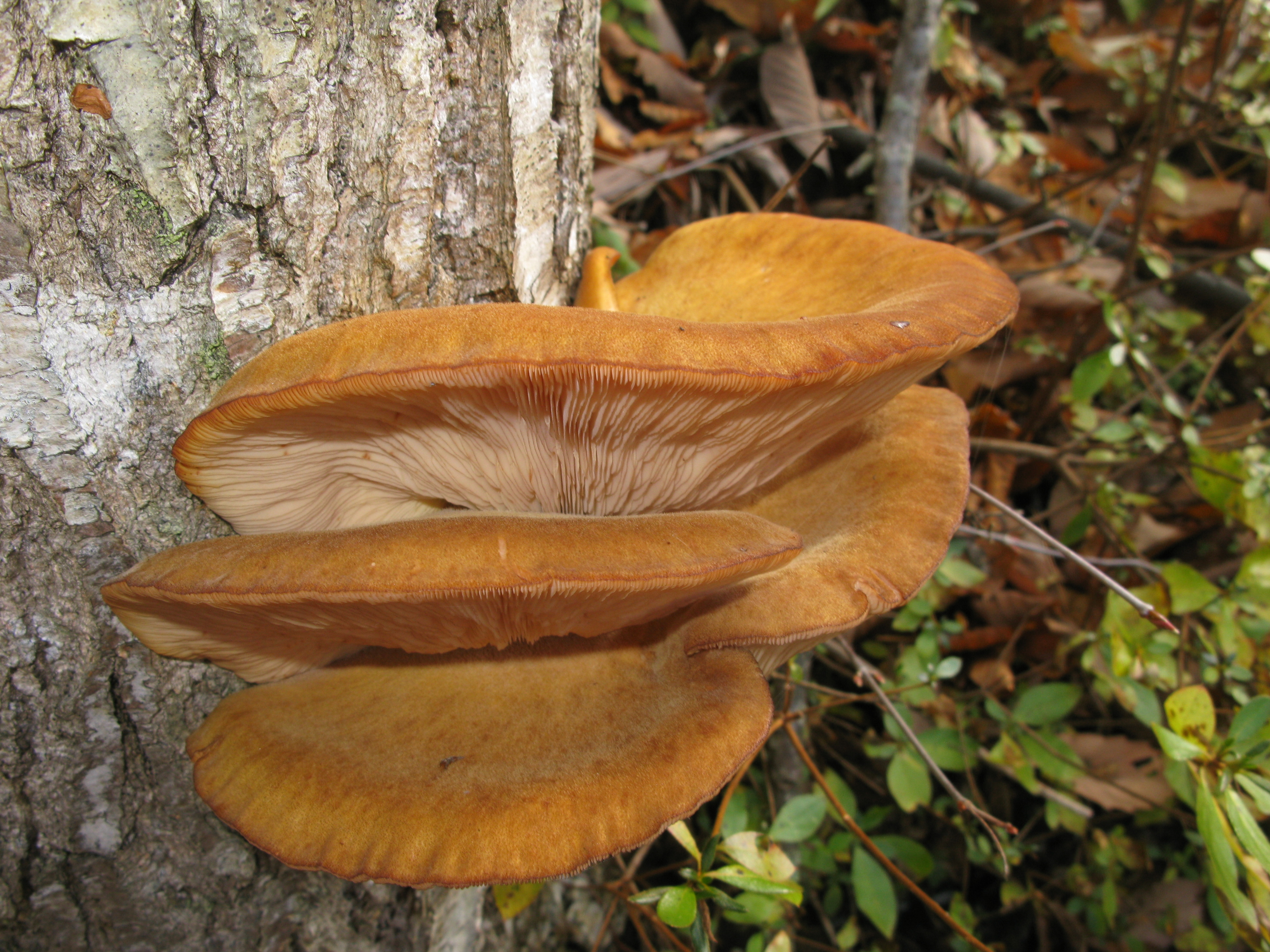
- Sarcomyxa edulis in Japan

Scientific classification
- Kingdom: Fungi
- Division: Basidiomycota
- Class: Agaricomycetes
- Order: Agaricales
- Family: Sarcomyxaceae
- Genus: Sarcomyxa
- Species: S. edulis

Binomial name
- Sarcomyxa edulis (Y.C. Dai, Niemelä & G.F. Qin) T. Saito, Tonouchi & T. Harada (2014)

Synonyms
- Panellus edulis Y.C. Dai, Niemelä & G.F. Qin (2003)

= Sarcomyxa edulis =

Species of fungus

Sarcomyxa edulis is a species of fungus in the family Sarcomyxaceae.

The fruit bodies grow as ochraceous to ochraceous-brown, overlapping fan- or oyster-shaped caps on the wood of deciduous trees. The gills on the underside are closely spaced, ochraceous, and have an adnate attachment to the stipe. Spores are smooth, amyloid, and measure 4.5–6 by 1–2 μm. The species was previously confused with the greenish-capped S. serotina, which is bitter-tasting.

Sarcomyxa edulis is known to occur in China, Japan, and the Russian Far East. It can be found in provinces of Hebei, Heilongjiang, Jilin, Shanxi, Guangxi, northern Shaanxi, Sichuan. According to one source, "it grows on the fallen woods of broad-leaved trees in remote mountains and old forests, but not all broad-leaved trees are suitable for its growth, and the rotten basswood is very easy to grow S. edulis".

Sarcomyxa edulis is mild-tasting and edible. In China, where it is known as "元蘑/yuanmo", "黄蘑/huangmo", or "冻蘑/dongmo", it is considered a nutritious delicacy, and is mass-cultivated. In Japan, where it is called mukitake, it is considered "one of the most delicious edible mushrooms" and a system has recently been developed to cultivate the mushroom in plastic greenhouses.
