= Filoboletus mycenoides =

Scientific classification
- Domain: Eukaryota
- Kingdom: Fungi
- Division: Basidiomycota
- Class: Agaricomycetes
- Order: Agaricales
- Family: Mycenaceae
- Genus: Filoboletus
- Species: F. mycenoides

Binomial name
- Filoboletus mycenoides Henn.

Species of fungus

Filoboletus mycenoides, is a species of agaric fungus in the family Mycenaceae native to Java, first described by Paul Christoph Hennings as the type species of Filoboletus.

== Morphology ==
Pileus membranous, minute, convex, smooth, glabrous, incarnate, 1-1.25 mm in diameter. Stipe central, thin and filiform, frosty white, glabrous, discoid base 15 mm long barely 200 μm thick. Tubular hymen indistinguishable from hymenophora. Pores rounded. Spores cylindrical, hyaline, 3.5 — 4 X 0.5 μm.
