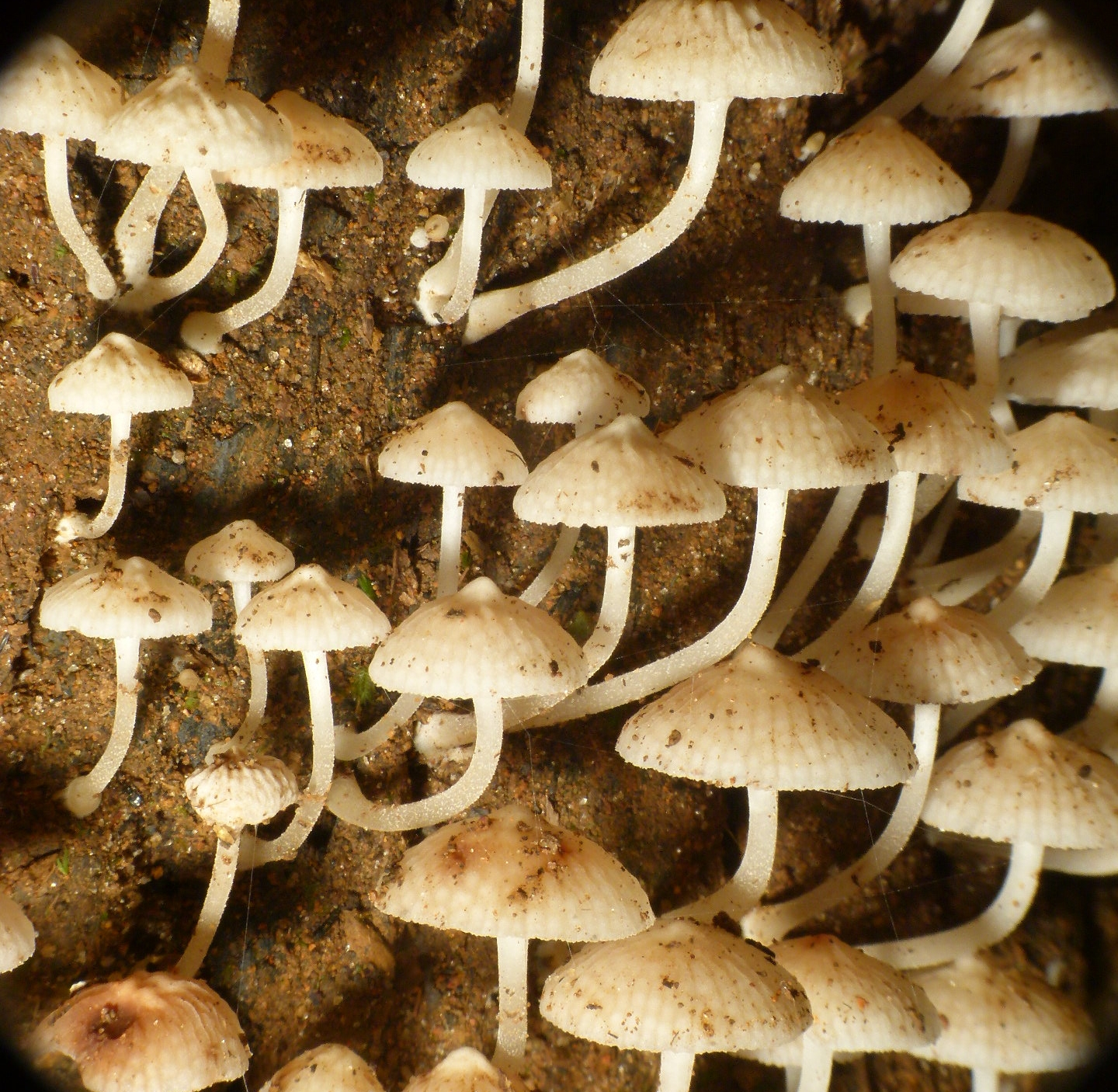
- Filoboletus manipularis

Scientific classification
- Kingdom: Fungi
- Division: Basidiomycota
- Class: Agaricomycetes
- Order: Agaricales
- Family: Mycenaceae
- Genus: Filoboletus; Henn.

Type species
- Filoboletus mycenoides

Other species
- See text

= Filoboletus =

Genus of fungi

Filoboletus is a genus of fungi in the family Mycenaceae.

The genus was circumscribed by Paul Christoph Hennings. Several species (e.g. Filoboletus hanedae, Filoboletus manipularis, Filoboletus pallescens and Filoboletus yunnanensis) display bioluminescence in fruiting bodies.

== Species ==
According to Catalogue of Life (as of February 2024), the genus has 16 accepted species:

- Filoboletus brevisporus Maas Geest.
- Filoboletus clypeatus (Pat.) Singer
- Filoboletus conus Maas Geest. & E. Horak
- Filoboletus elegans Maas Geest. & E. Horak
- Filoboletus gracilis (Klotzsch ex Berk.) Singer
- Filoboletus hanedae (Kobayasi) Hongo
- Filoboletus lachiwalensis Maas Geest.
- Filoboletus luteus (Overeem) Singer
- Filoboletus manipularis (Berk.) Singer
- Filoboletus mycenoides Henn.
- Filoboletus pallescens (Boedijn) Maas Geest.
- Filoboletus polyporus Maas Geest. & E. Horak
- Filoboletus propullulans Lib.-Barnes
- Filoboletus pustulosus Maas Geest. & E. Horak
- Filoboletus verruculosus P.G. Liu
- Filoboletus yunnanensis P.G. Liu
