= Pleurotoid fungi =

Side-attached fungi/oyster mushrooms

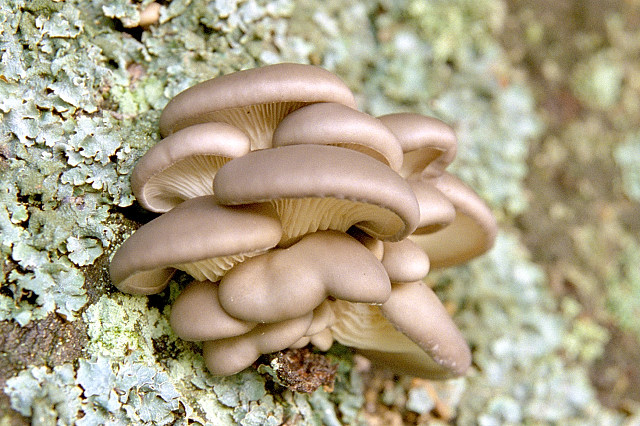
Pleurotus ostreatus

Gilled fungi with laterally-attached fruiting bodies are classified as pleurotoid (Gr.: pleurē + ōtos + -oid, literally "side-ear form" or "having the likeness of Pleurotus ssp."). Pleurotoid fungi are typically wood-decay fungi and are found on dead and dying trees and coarse woody debris. The pleurotoid form is polyphyletic, having evolved a number of times within the Basidiomycota. Many species of pleurotoid fungi are commonly referred to as "oyster" mushrooms. Laterally-attached fungi with pores rather than gills are referred to as bracket fungi.

== Genera ==
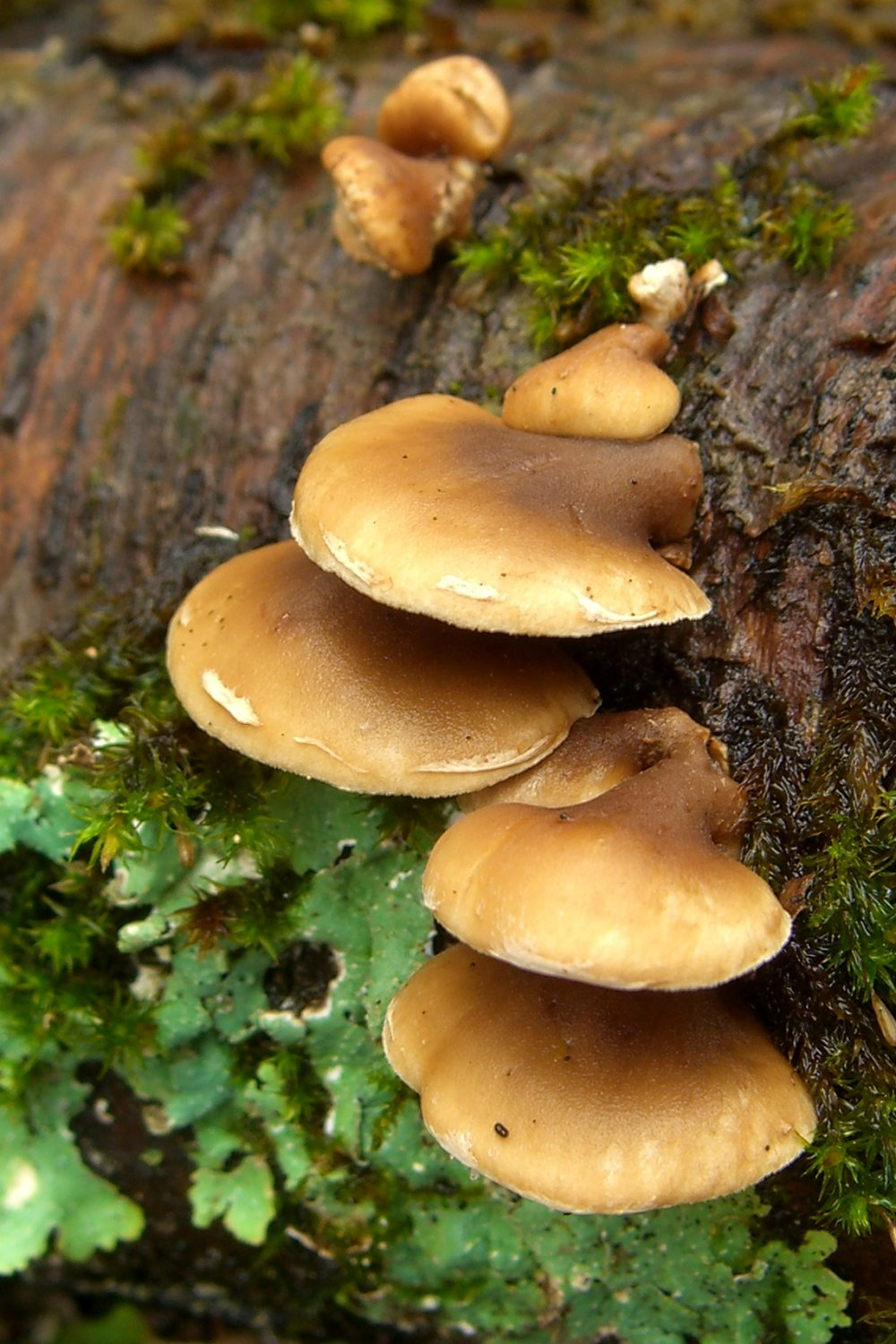
Tectella operculata

=== Agaricales ===
- Cheimonophyllum
- Crepidotus
- Hohenbuehelia
- Hypsizygus
- Ossicaulis
- Panellus
- Phyllotopsis
- Pleurocybella — Angel wings
- Pleurotus — Oyster mushrooms
- Resupinatus — Oysterlings
- Schizophyllum
- Tectella

=== Polyporales ===
- Lentinus
- Panus

=== Russulales ===
- Lactifluus - some species
- Lentinellus
- Russula - some species
