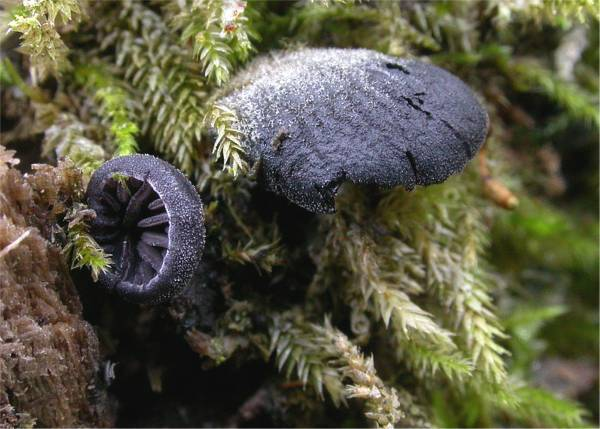
- Resupinatus applicatus

Scientific classification
- Domain: Eukaryota
- Kingdom: Fungi
- Division: Basidiomycota
- Class: Agaricomycetes
- Order: Agaricales
- Family: Resupinataceae
- Genus: Resupinatus
- Species: R. applicatus

Binomial name
- Resupinatus applicatus (Batsch) Gray

= Resupinatus applicatus =

Species of fungus

Resupinatus applicatus, commonly known as the smoked oysterling or the black jelly oyster, is a species of fungus in the family Tricholomataceae, and the type species of the genus Resupinatus. First described in 1786 as Agaricus applicatus by August Johann Georg Karl Batsch, it was transferred to Resupinatus by Samuel Frederick Gray in 1821.

== Description ==
The cuplike to convex fruit bodies of the fungus are 0.2 to 0.6 cm (0.1 to 0.2 in) in diameter, and grayish-blue to grayish-black in color. The dry cap surface is covered with small, fine hairs. The mushrooms have no stem, and have a firm but gelatinous flesh. The mushrooms produce a white spore print.

=== Similar species ===
It may resemble other species of its genus as well as Hohenbuehelia atrocoerulea.

== Habitat and distribution ==
The fungus is saprobic, and grows on decaying wood. It is widely distributed in North America, Europe, and Australia.
