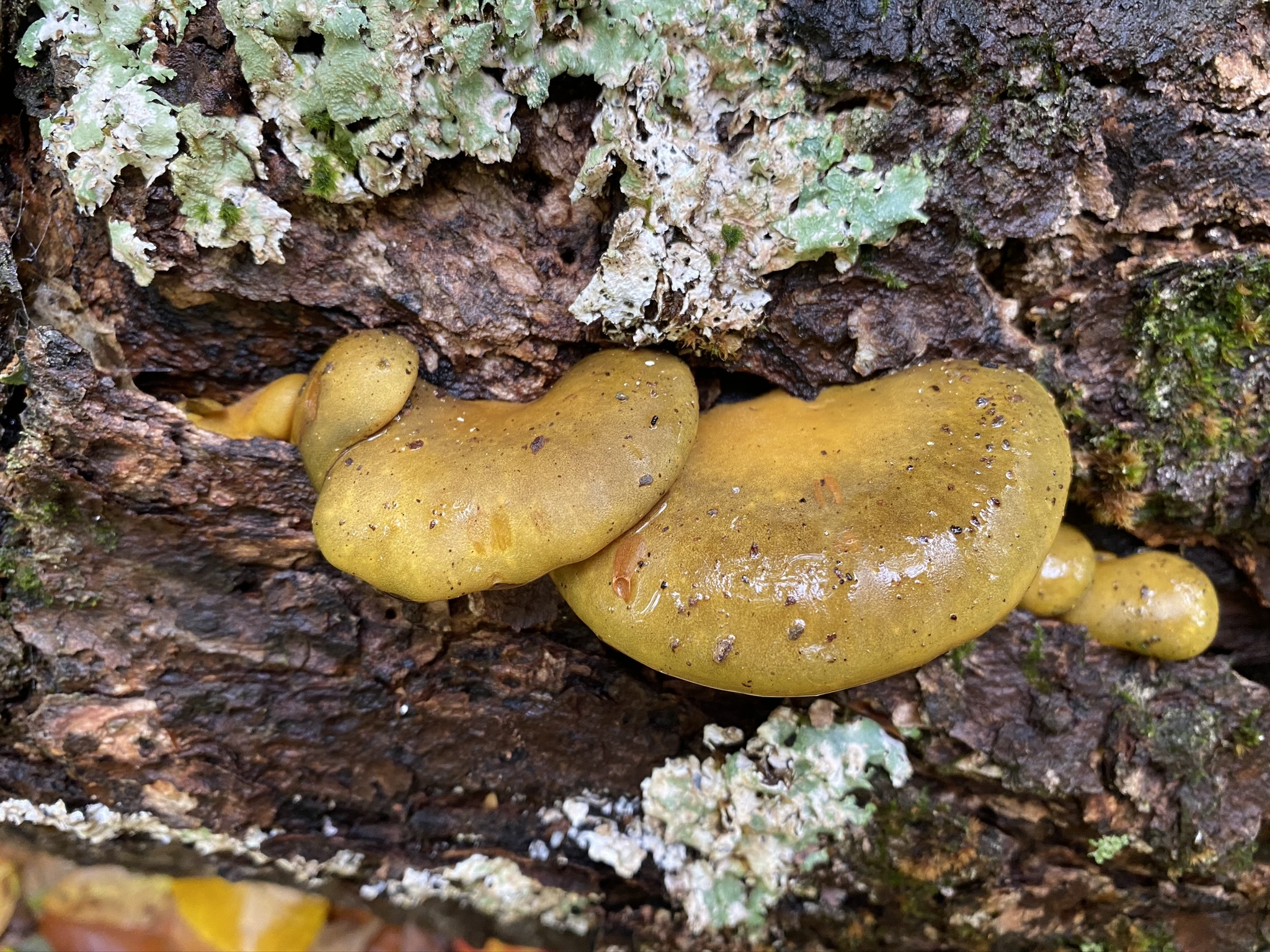
- Sarcomyxa serotina

Scientific classification
- Kingdom: Fungi
- Division: Basidiomycota
- Class: Agaricomycetes
- Order: Agaricales
- Family: Sarcomyxaceae; Olariaga, Huhtinen, Læssøe, J.H. Petersen & K. Hansen (2020)
- Genus: Sarcomyxa; P. Karst. (1891)

Type species
- Sarcomyxa serotina (Pers.) P. Karst. (1891)

= Sarcomyxa =

Genus of fungi

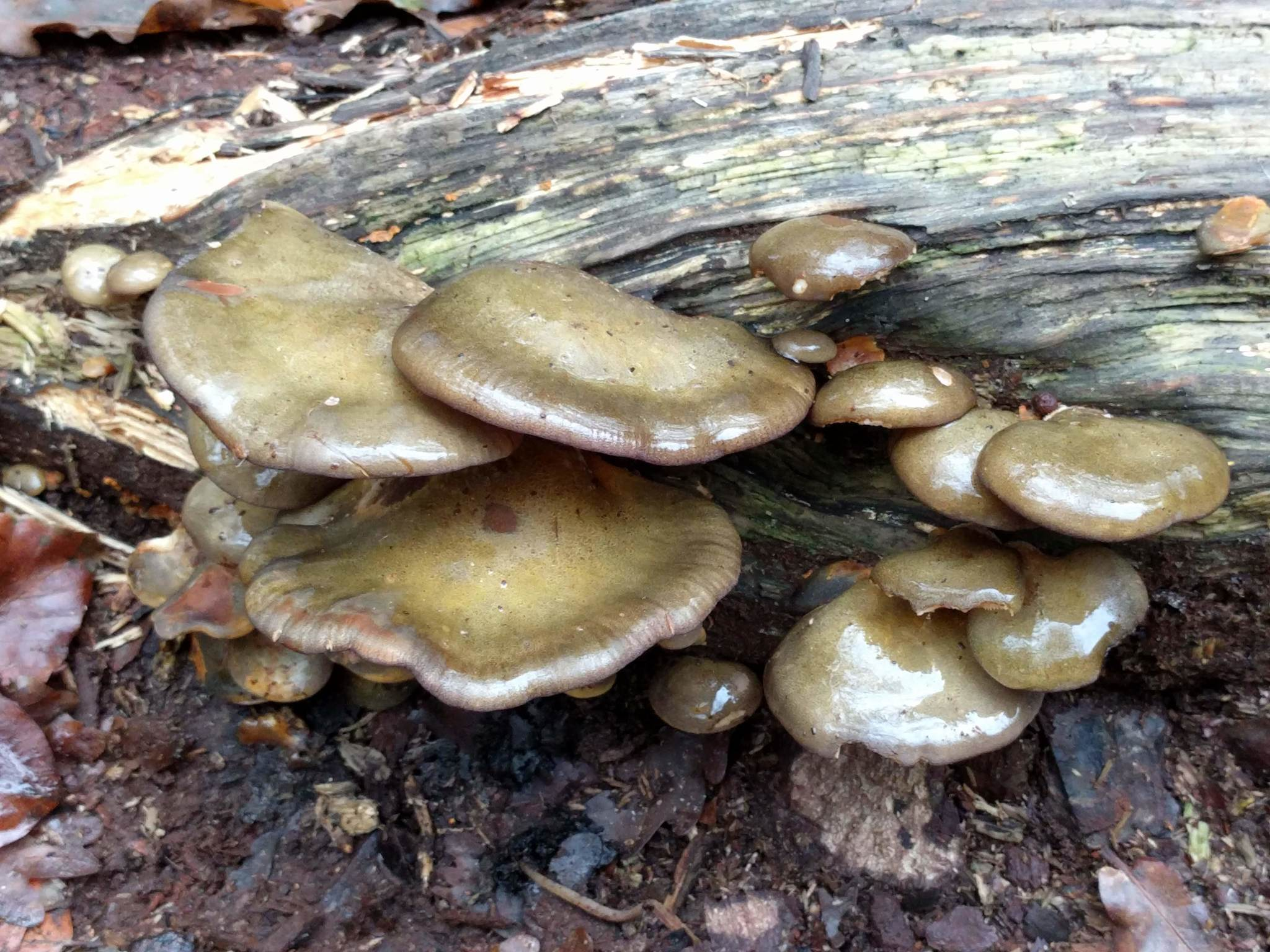
Sarcomyxa serotina

Sarcomyxa is a small genus of agaricoid fungi in the Sarcomyxaceae. Basidiocarps (fruit bodies) are shelf-like and grow on wood. Sarcomyxa edulis is commercially cultivated for food in Asia.

The genus is the only member of Sarcomyxaceae, a classification established as a result of molecular research, based on cladistic analysis of DNA sequences.

== Species ==
- Sarcomyxa baishanzuensis
- Sarcomyxa edulis
- Sarcomyxa ochracea
- Sarcomyxa serotina

== See also ==
- List of Agaricales genera
- List of Agaricales families
