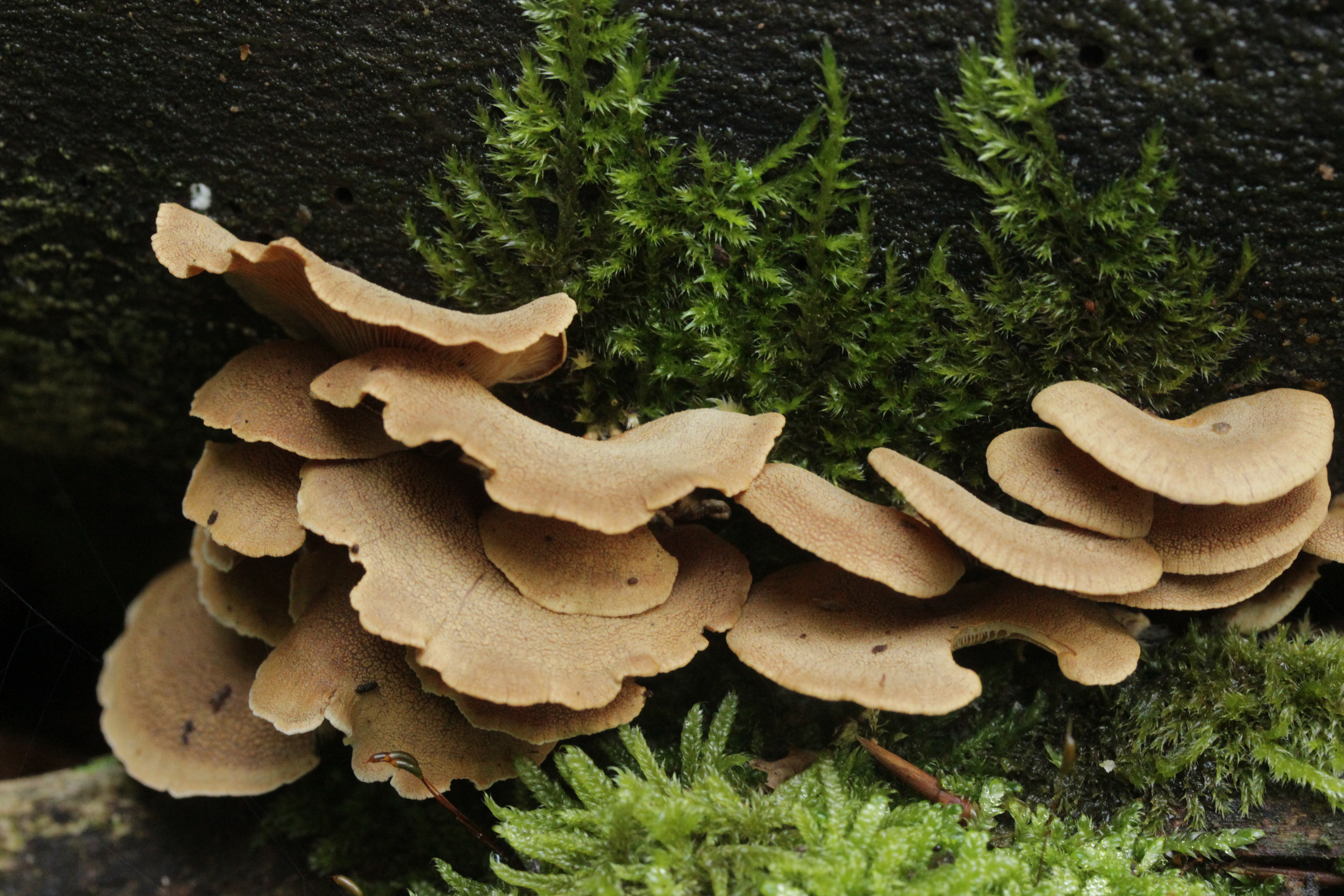

Scientific classification
- Kingdom: Fungi
- Division: Basidiomycota
- Class: Agaricomycetes
- Order: Agaricales
- Family: Mycenaceae
- Genus: Panellus
- Species: P. stipticus

Binomial name
- Panellus stipticus (Bull.) P.Karst. (1879)

Synonyms
- Agaricus stypticus Bull. (1783); Merulius stipticus (Bull.) Lam. (1815); Crepidopus stypticus (Bull.) Gray (1821); Rhipidium stipticum (Bull.) Wallr. (1833); Panus stipticus (Bull.) Fr. (1838); Pleurotus stipticus (Bull.) P.Kumm. (1871); Lentinus stipticus (Bull.) J.Schröt. (1889); Pocillaria stiptica (Bull.) Kuntze (1898)

= Panellus stipticus =

Species of fungus

Panellus stipticus
- Mycological characteristics
- Gills on hymenium
- Cap is convex or offset
- Hymenium is free
- Stipe is bare
- Spore print is white
- Ecology is saprotrophic
- Edibility is inedible

Panellus stipticus, commonly known as the bitter oyster, the astringent panus, the luminescent panellus, or the stiptic fungus, is a species of fungus in the family Mycenaceae. It is the type species of the genus Panellus. The fungus was given its current scientific name in 1879, but has been known by many names since French mycologist Jean Bulliard first described it as Agaricus stypticus in 1783. Molecular phylogenetic analysis revealed P. stipticus to have a close genetic relationship with members of the genus Mycena.

Starting out as tiny white knobs, over a period of one to three months, the mushrooms develop into fan- or kidney-shaped caps that measure up to 3 cm (1.2 in) broad. The caps are orange-yellow to brownish, and attached to the decaying wood by short stubby stalks that are connected off-center or on the side of the caps. Strains from eastern North America are typically bioluminescent, but those from the Pacific coast regions of North America and from other continents are not. The luminescence is localized to the edges of the gills and the junction of the gills with the stem and cap. Bioluminescence is also observable with mycelia grown in laboratory culture, and the growth conditions for optimal light production have been studied in detail. Several chemicals have been isolated and characterized that are believed to be responsible for light production. Genetic analysis has shown that luminescence is controlled by a single dominant allele.

A common and widely distributed species, it is found in Eurasia, Australia, and North America, where it grows in groups or dense overlapping clusters on the logs, stumps, and trunks of deciduous trees, especially beech, oak, and birch. Modern research has probed the potential of P. stipticus as a tool in bioremediation, because of its ability to detoxify various environmental pollutants.

== Taxonomy ==
- - - Resinomycena acadiensis
    - - - Dictyopanus pusillus
        - Panellus stipticus
      - - Mycena galericulata
        - - Mycena rutilanthiformis
          - - Mycena clavicularis
            - Other Panellus spp. and Hygrocybe citrinopallida

Phylogeny and relationships of P. stipticus and related species based on ribosomal DNA sequences

The species was first named Agaricus stypticus by the French botanist Jean Bulliard in 1783, and later sanctioned by Elias Magnus Fries under this name in 1821. Fries later changed the genus as well as the spelling of the epithet and called it Panus stipticus. The species has had an extensive taxonomic history and been shuffled to a number of genera by various authors, resulting in several synonyms: Agaricus flabelliformis (Johann Friedrich Gmelin, 1792), Pocillaria stiptica (Otto Kuntze, 1898), Rhipidium stipticum (Karl Friedrich Wilhelm Wallroth, 1833), Crepidopus stipticus (Samuel Frederick Gray, 1821), Pleurotus stipticus (Paul Kummer), Lentinus stipticus (Joseph Schröter, 1885), and Merulius stipticus (Jean-Baptiste Lamarck). It was Finnish mycologist Petter Karsten who in 1879 assigned its current name. Panellus stypticus is still used in the literature as a variant spelling.

Panellus stipticus is the type species of the genus Panellus, and, in Rolf Singer's authoritative 1986 classification of the Agaricales, it is also the type species of subgenus Panellus, an infrageneric (below the taxonomic level of genus) grouping of Panellus species characterized by the absence of cystidia on the sides of the gills. More recently, phylogenetic analyses of the sequences of their ribosomal large subunit genes have concluded that Panellus stipticus is closely related to the poroid mushroom Dictyopanus pusillus. The molecular analysis supports a previous assessment by mycologists Harold Bursdall and Orson K. Miller, who in 1975 suggested merging Dictyopanus into Panellus based on similarities in spore shape, stem structure, and the ability of dried fruit bodies to revive when moistened. Formerly grouped in the family Tricholomataceae, a wastebasket taxon of gilled mushrooms with white spores, P. stipticus is now classified in the Mycenaceae, after a large-scale phylogenetic analysis revealed "a previously unsuspected relationship between Mycena and Panellus (including Dictyopanus)".

The fungus is commonly known as the bitter oyster, the luminescent panellus, the astringent panus, or the styptic fungus. The specific epithet stipticus refers to its purported value in stopping bleeding. Etymologically, it is a Greek equivalent to the Latin word astringens, deriving from στυπτικός (styptikós), itself from the verb στύφειν (styphein), "to contract".

== Description ==
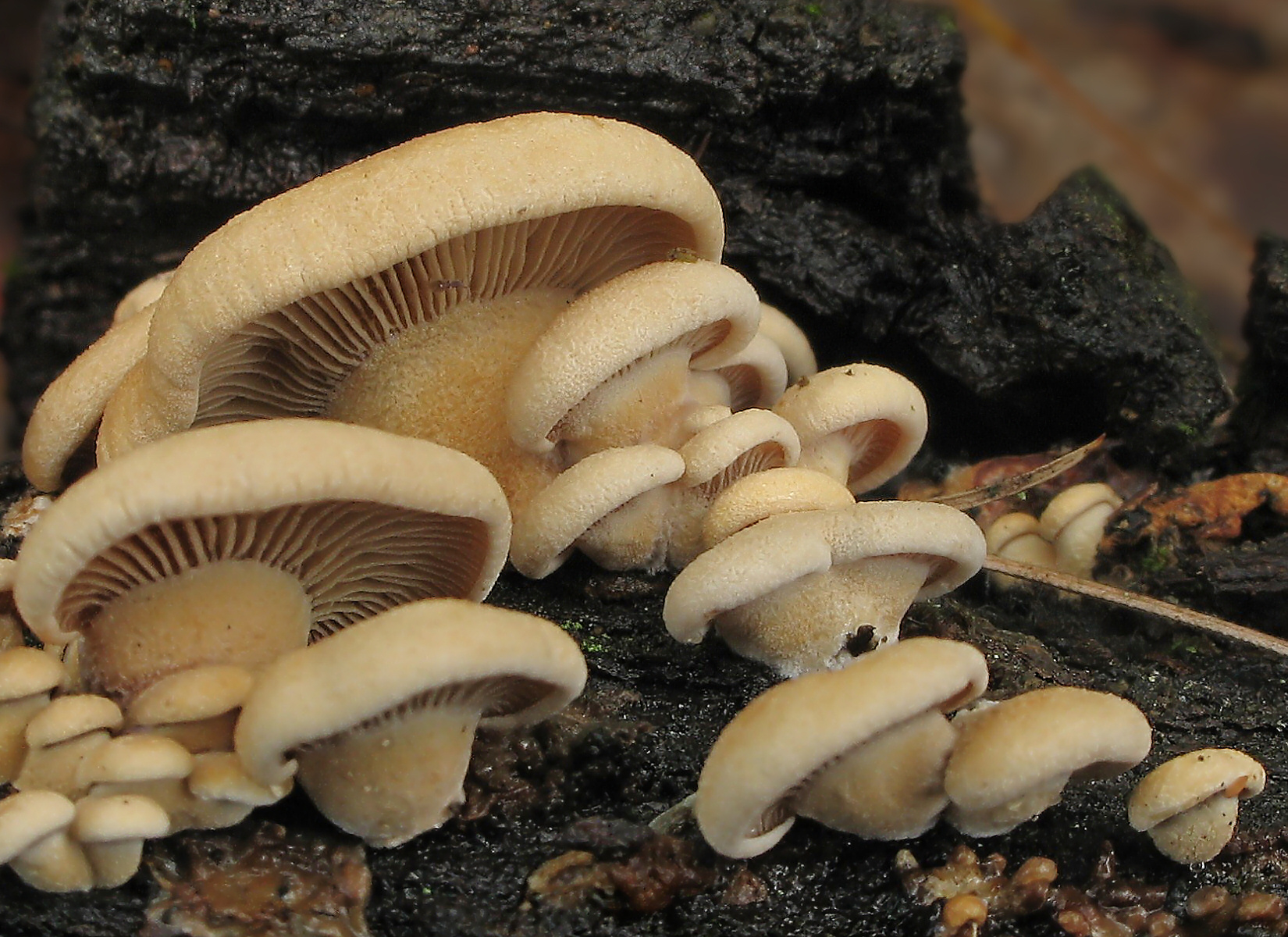
The buff-colored gills are closely spaced together, and are connected by cross-veins.

The fungus normally exists unseen, in the form of a mass of threadlike vegetative cells called a mycelium, inhabiting rotting wood; only when suitable environmental conditions of temperature, moisture, and nutrient availability are achieved does the fungus produce the reproductive structures known as fruit bodies, or mushrooms. The cap of the fruit body is kidney- or clamshell-shaped, convex to roughly flat, with dimensions of 1.2 to 3.2 cm (0.5 to 1.3 in) by 1.2 to 2.5 cm (0.5 to 1.0 in). The edges of the caps are scalloped with small rounded teeth, and curved slightly inward. The cap surface is dry, with a pattern of block-like areas similar to cracked dried mud; the surface is also covered with small fine hairs that give it a somewhat woolly consistency. It may have several concentric ridges or zones. Fresh fruit bodies range in color from yellowish-orange to buff to cinnamon; when dried they may be various shades of tan, brown or clay. The faded colors of dried fruit bodies tend to revive when moistened. On the underside of the cap, the gills are narrow and spaced closely together, often forked, brownish to buff, and with numerous interconnecting cross-veins.

Supporting the cap is a stem that is 0.5 to 2 cm (0.2 to 0.8 in) long by 0.3 to 0.8 cm (0.1 to 0.3 in) thick and has an off-center attachment to the cap, either at or near the cap side. The dull-white stem is covered with minute silk-like fibers and is narrower at the base where it attaches to the substrate. Fruit bodies do not have any distinctive odor. The flesh is thin, tough, and dark yellow-brown to cream-colored.

=== Fruit body development ===
Fruit bodies first appear as tiny white knobs less than a cubic millimeter in size. In a day or two the knobs grow into a horizontal pyramidal mass, increasing in height as the hyphae lengthen. This is soon followed by the formation of a minute cap, and lengthening of the stem. The stem is about 1 mm long when the cap first begins to form. The hyphae that comprise the stem gradually cease to grow at their ends, and then start to branch, with many of the branches growing in a horizontal direction. This growth, indicated by the flattening and broadening out of the top of the stem, gives rise to the cap. The horizontally aligned hyphae grow vertical branches which remain more or less parallel, ultimately forming the dorsal tissue of the cap. Other similar downward-growing branches form the fertile hymenium, which can be seen when the cap is about 2 mm in diameter.

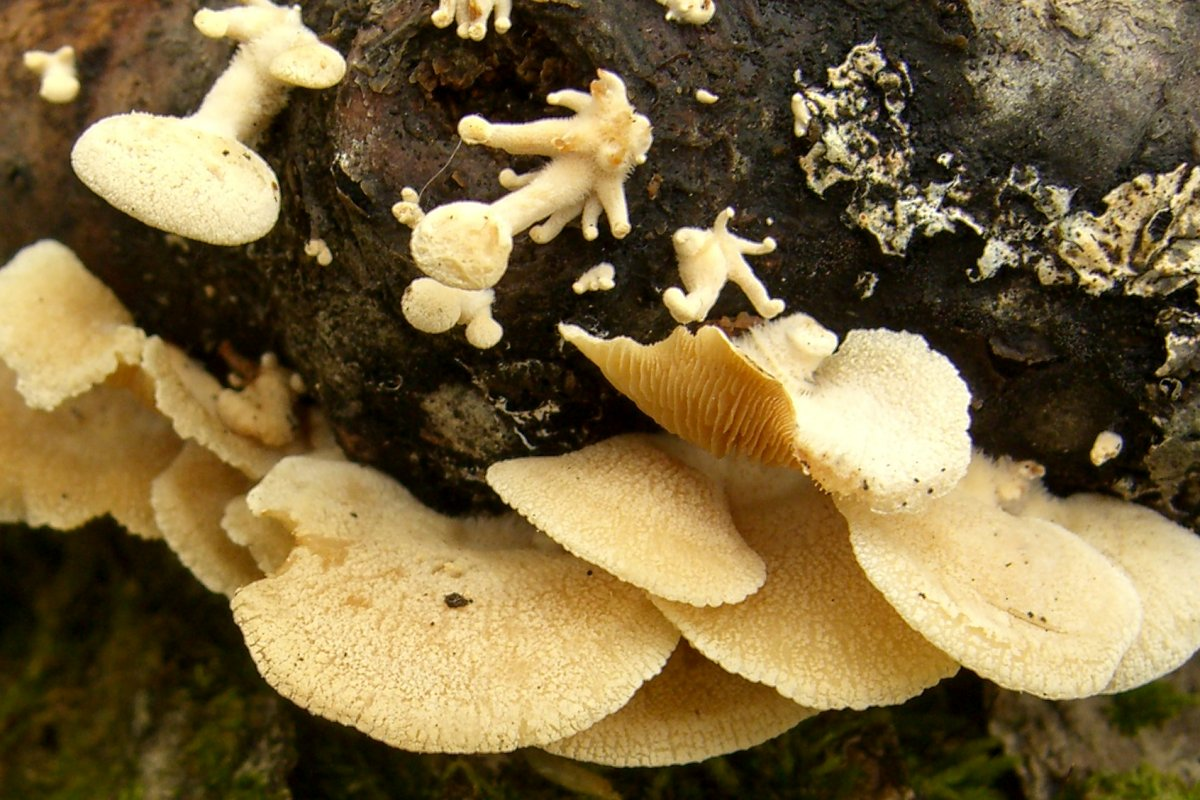
The caps of young fruit bodies (top) are spherical, and grow epinastically, so that the developing gills remain enclosed until maturity.

The young cap is spherical and its growth is at first epinastic, its margin being curved inwards and pressed against the stem. In this way, the hymenium begins its development within a special enclosed chamber. As the hymenial surface increases and keeps pace with the growth of the dorsal tissue of the cap, the latter expands and exposes the gills. The gills are formed by the continual downward growth of some of the hyphae. The gills are exposed before the cap is completely developed, and before the spores are mature. Spores can be produced by fruit bodies as small as 1.3 cm (0.5 in) broad, and liberation of the spores continues until the fruit body is fully grown—a period of one month to three months, depending on the conditions of temperature and moisture. The mature spores are disseminated by the wind. When the fruit body is nearing maturity, some of the terminal portions of the hyphae of the dorsal surface of the cap separate, and as a consequence, the upper surface of the fruit body becomes granular in appearance.

The fruit body projects out horizontally from the growing surface. If the position of a log is altered after young fruit bodies with the beginnings of gills have appeared, the stems of these attempt to readjust themselves in order to place the cap in a horizontal position. The cap are sometimes zonate (marked with concentric lines that form alternating pale and darker zones); this depends on changes in the humidity of the environment, as variations in the amount of moisture will cause alternating periods of acceleration or slowing of growth.

A yellowish-brown pigment is diffused through the cytosol of the hyphae and is much deeper in color just below the cuticle of the cap. In very young fruit bodies, stems and caps are very pale buff, but soon the color of the cap deepens and becomes cinnamon. The intensity of the color appears to be dependent on light, for when fruit bodies are grown in diffuse light (temperature and humidity being constant) they are a uniform pale buff color, but in bright light they are cinnamon or tan.

=== Reproduction ===
Panellus stipticus uses a heterothallic, tetrapolar mating system: each basidiospore develops into a self-sterile mycelium which, when grown alone, remains homokaryotic (i.e., with all cells genetically identical) indefinitely. Researchers have paired collections of P. stipticus from Japan and Eastern North America, and later, collections from New Zealand and Russia. Although the separated allopatric populations differ in bioluminescence and taste, the results revealed a universal intercompatibility group over these geographical regions. In a 2001 study, Jin and colleagues also paired geographically representative collections of the fungus, but observed a reduced ability to cross between Northern Hemisphere and Oceanian collections, as well as between and within Oceanian collections.

=== Microscopic features ===
Various microscopic characteristics may be used to help identify the fungus from other morphologically similar species. A spore print of P. stipticus, made by depositing a large number of spores in a small area, reveals their color to be white. Viewed with a microscope, the spores are smooth-walled, elliptical to nearly allantoid (sausage-shaped), with dimensions of 3–6 by 2–3 μm. Spores are amyloid, meaning that they will absorb iodine and become bluish-black when stained with Melzer's reagent, but this staining reaction has been described as "relatively weak".

The basidia (the spore-bearing cells) are 15–20 by 2.5–3.5 μm, club-shaped, and clamped at the base. The spores are attached to the end of the basidia by four projections called sterigmata that are 1–3.5 μm long. Cystidia are hyphal cells in the hymenium that do not produce basidiospores; they also make up the surfaces of the fruit body (the pelli or "cuticles"). They are usually structurally distinct from the basidia, and their features may be used as microscopic characters to help distinguish and differentiate similar fungi. The cheilocystidia are found on the gill edge; in P. stipticus they are narrowly club-shaped, cylindrical, spindle-shaped to bifurcate at the apex. They are also thin-walled, hyaline (translucent), abundant and crowded, and measure 17–45 by 3.5–6 μm. The pleurocystidia, located on the gill face, are 17–40 by 3–4.5 μm, spindle- or club-shaped, sometimes bifurcate at the apex, thin-walled, and hyaline. They are scattered or in dense clusters, mostly embedded in hymenium, occasionally protruding up to half the width of the hymenium.

The flesh of the cap consists of a number of microscopically distinct layers of tissue. The cuticle of the cap (known as the pileipellis) is between 8–10 μm thick, and is made of a loose textura intricata, a type of tissue in which the hyphae are irregularly interwoven with distinct spaces between them. The cuticle hyphae are thick-walled to thin-walled, with scattered inconspicuous cystidia measuring 40–55 by 3.5–5.5 μm. These cystidia located in the cap (pileocystidia) are cylindrical, thin-walled, yellow in Melzer's reagent, hyaline in KOH, sometimes with amorphous dingy brown material coating the walls. Beneath the cuticle layer is a zone 54–65 μm thick, made of very loosely entwined, thin-walled hyphae, 2–3 μm in thickness, with clamps at the septa. Below this is a zone 208–221 μm in thickness, in which the densely compacted hyphae, 3–8 μm in diameter, have swollen, gelatinized walls, and often more or less a vertical orientation. This in turn is followed by a layer 520 μm in thickness, formed of loosely interwoven hyphae, 2–8 μm in width, some of which have thin walls with clamps at the septa, whilst others have somewhat thickened gelatinized walls. The flesh of the cap has a layer of upright hyphae bending into a lower layer of interwoven hyphae with diameters of 2.5–8 μm. The flesh of the gills is similar to that of the lower cap.

=== Similar species ===
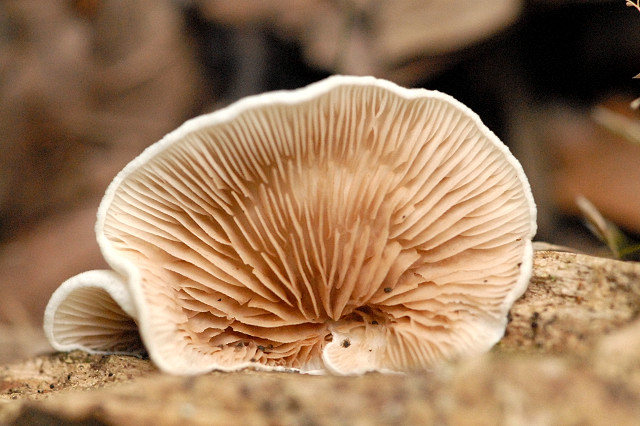
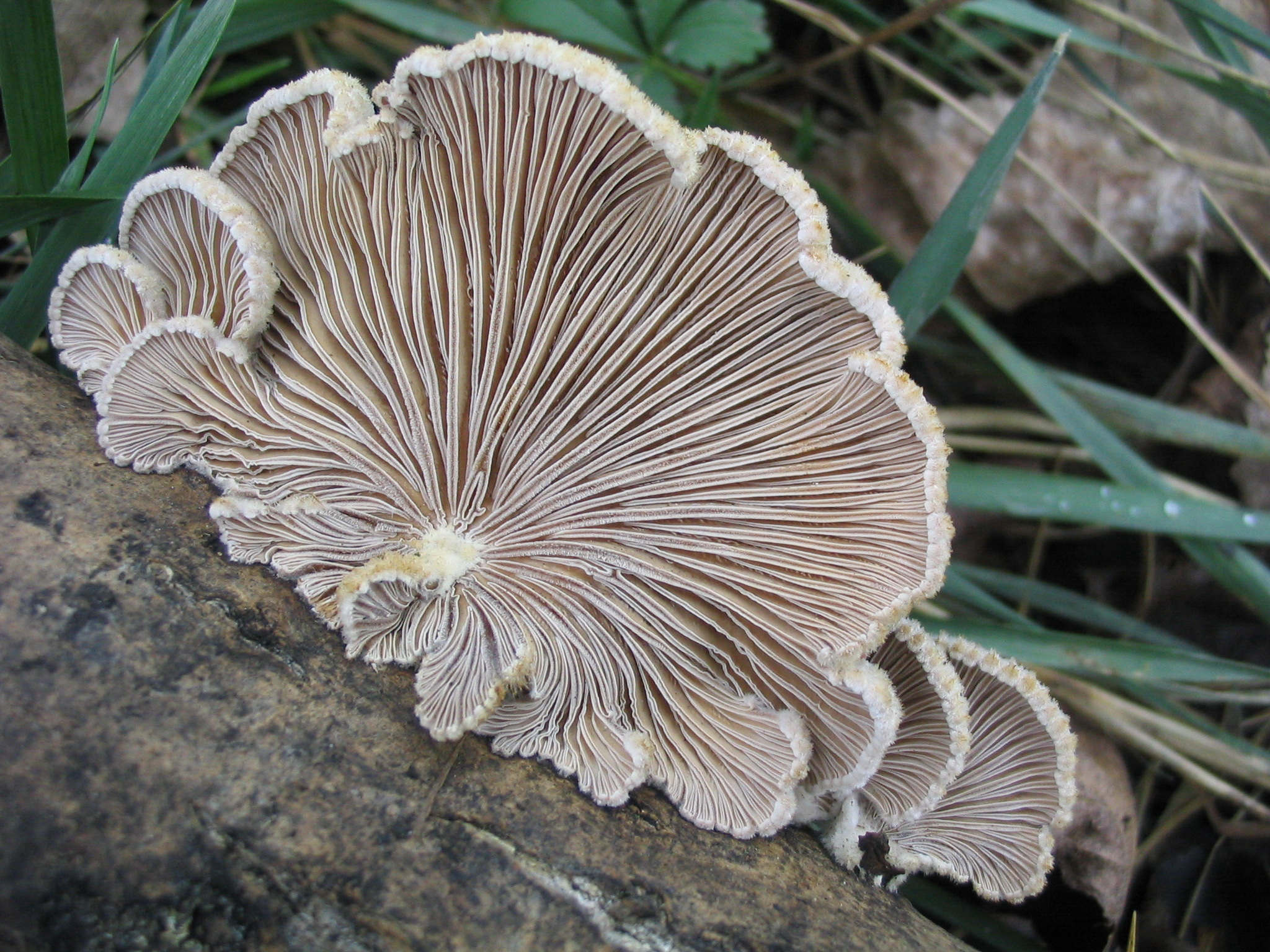
Lookalike species Crepidotus mollis (top) and Schizophyllum commune

The relatives P. mitus (a rare West Coast species) and P. pusilis (distributed mostly in Florida) are similar.

Species of Crepidotus having a similar shape can be distinguished by their brown spore print, compared with the white spore print of P. stipticus. Schizophyllum commune has a densely hairy white to grayish cap and longitudinally split gill-folds on the underside. The ruddy panus mushroom (Panus rudis) is larger, has a reddish-brown cap that fades to pinkish-tan, and shows lilac tinges when young, fresh, and moist.

== Bioluminescence ==
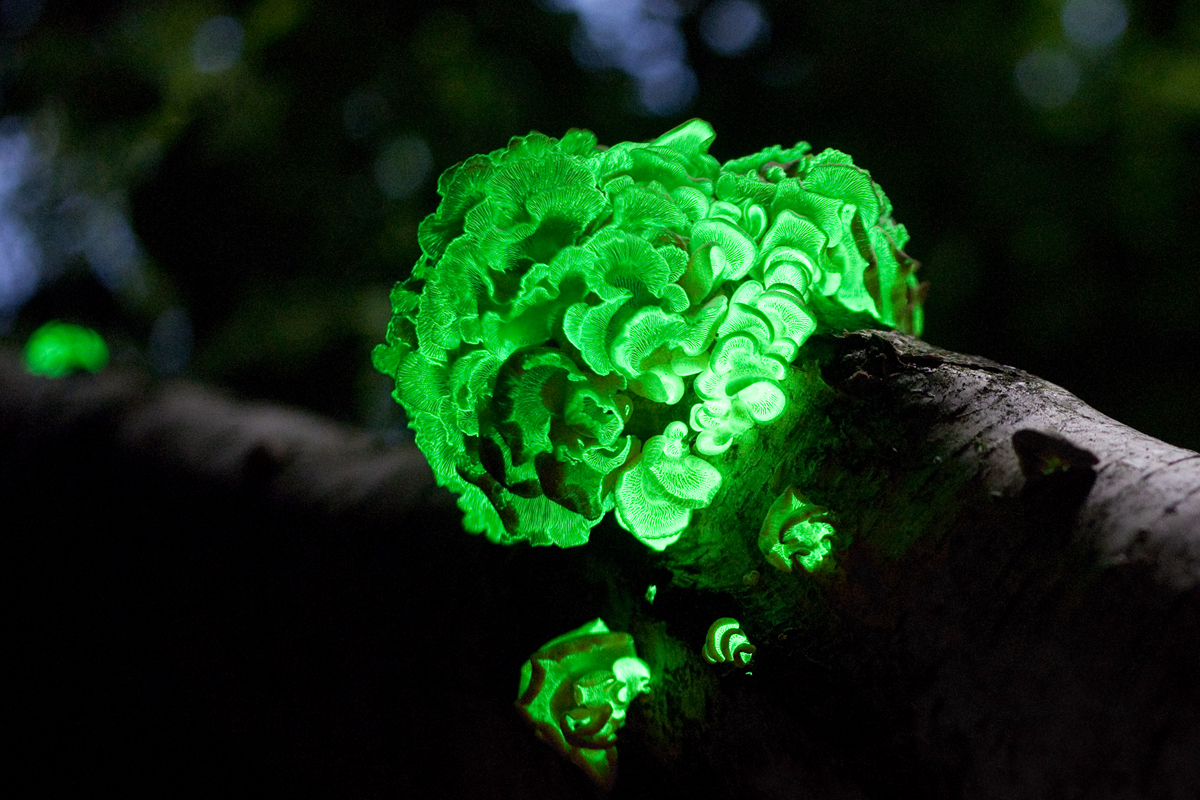
Long-exposure photography showing bioluminescent activity from over 8 1/2 minutes

Bioluminescence is the ability of certain living things in the environment to produce light by the action of enzymes. Bioluminescent fungi are widespread, and over 70 species are known. Although the intensity of their luminescence is generally low compared to many other bioluminescent organisms, fungi glow continuously for days, so their total emission is comparable with that of most brightly luminescent organisms, such as fireflies. Luminous fungi are found growing on decaying wood, leading to the popular name of "foxfire" or "glow wood" when their glow is visible at night. The responsible oxidative enzymes—known generically as luciferases—produce light by oxidizing a pigment called a luciferin. In some areas, P. stypticus is bioluminescent, and the fruit bodies of these strains will glow in the dark when fresh or sometimes when revived in water after drying.

An early record of luminescence noted in P. stypticus was made by the American naturalist Thomas G. Gentry in 1885. Job Bicknell Ellis, reporting on the phenomenon for the Journal of Mycology, wrote:

By careful examination, the luminosity was found to proceed from the gills and not the stipe, nor from any fragment of rotten wood attached to the specimen. This phosphorescence was not observed in all specimens brought in for examination, and seemed to depend on some peculiar condition of the air, having been noticed only in specimens gathered in damp weather or just before a storm.

Canadian mycologist Buller in 1924 described the gills of P. stipticus in North America as luminescent, and noted that the fungus glows most strongly at the time of spore maturation. Bioluminescence has not been observed in European specimens, in Pacific North American collections, nor in strains collected from New Zealand, Russia, and Japan. Although a number of reports have confirmed that eastern North American strains are luminescent, non-luminescent North American strains are also known. In general, the intensity of fungal bioluminescence decreases after exposure to certain contaminants; this sensitivity is being investigated as a means to develop bioluminescence-based biosensors to test the toxicity of polluted soils. Most known luminescent fungi are in the genus Mycena or closely allied genera; this grouping of fungi—known as the "mycenoid lineage"—includes P. stipticus and three other Panellus species.

=== Mycelia ===
The mycelia of this species, grown in laboratory culture, have also been shown to be bioluminescent. Early studies demonstrated that short-wave ultraviolet light (at a wavelength of 280 nm) reversibly inhibited the luminescence of P. stypticus mycelia, while longer wavelength (366 nm) ultraviolet was stimulatory. Further, the fungus exhibited a pronounced diurnal periodicity, and maximum luminescence was noted between 6 and 9 pm, regardless as to whether the mycelial cultures were incubated in continuous light, continuous darkness, or a normal day-night cycle. The mycelia of P. stipticus grown submerged in liquid were non-luminescent, but became luminescent while growing on solid substrata. Dark-grown colonies were luminescent in the center, and light-grown colonies were brightest at the periphery. Other experiments have shown that growth temperature and pH have a significant effect on the level of bioluminescence, optimized at 22 °C (72 °F) and pH 3–3.5. However, light had a significant effect on mycelial growth but not on bioluminescence, and the optimal light conditions for maximum bioluminescence were total darkness.

=== Fruit bodies ===
Bioluminescent tissue in the mature fruit body is restricted to the edge of the gills (as well as the cross-veins that connect them), the junction of the gills with the stem, and the inrolled cap edge. Distribution of bioluminescence along the gill edge corresponds to the position of the cheilocystidia. Less than 10% of the light emitted from both the young and mature fruit bodies is from other tissues, including the fertile hymenial area and the stem. Fruit body luminescence is highly variable between fruit bodies found on different logs in different environments.

=== Genetics ===
In Mount Vernon, Wisconsin

Using techniques of genetic complementation, Macrae paired nonluminescent monocaryons with luminescent ones, and concluded that luminosity in P. stipticus is an inherited character, and governed by a single pair of alleles in which luminosity was dominant over nonluminosity. Luminosity factors were independent of intersterility factors. In 1992, Lingle and colleagues agreed with Macrae about luminosity and stated that at least three different gene mutations could lead to the loss of luminescence. They also reported that the maximum bioluminescence was found at 525 nm, and shifted to 528 nm in deeply pigmented fruit bodies.

After intercontinental compatibility tests, Petersen and Bermudes suggested that bioluminescence and compatibility were independent since bioluminescence seemed to be geographically restricted. This suggested that the ability or potential to interbreed must have been preserved since separation of P. stypticus into geographically isolated areas.

=== Function ===
Several authors have suggested that the purpose of fungal bioluminescence is to attract arthropods to the fruit body to help disseminate spores. However, there has been no direct observation of this phenomenon. In many species, the mycelium is luminescent, but the fruit body is not, which argues against this hypothesis. Mycelial bioluminescence may also function to attract animals that can potentially carry fungal spores in well-hydrated areas, as light emission from the mycelium is higher when it is hydrated. This would presumably increase the chance that spores would be deposited in an environment that is already optimal for growth. Basidiomycete mushrooms are known to be dependent on an adequate moisture supply for proper development. In species with a luminous mycelium, the mycelium would therefore have a dual function in performing the fungal translocation that permits transport of substances from the further environment back to the fruiting body, and in attracting disseminating vectors towards environments favorable for development of the species.

=== Chemical basis ===
The chemical structure of panal

In general, bioluminescence is caused by the action of luciferases, enzymes that produce light by the oxidation of a luciferin (a pigment). Several studies have evaluated the biochemical basis of light production in Panellus stipticus, and concluded that there is no specific fungal luciferase. The fungus was shown in 1988 to contain the sesquiterpene panal, which has a cadinene keto-aldehyde chemical structure. Later, two additional precursors were isolated, PS-A (1-O-decanoylpanal) and PS-B (1-O-dodecanoylpanal). If these compounds are treated with salt of ammonia or primary amines in the presence of iron(II), hydrogen peroxide, and a cationic surfactant, light is emitted by a chemiluminescence reaction, suggesting that panal and its derivatives are fungal luciferins, and that the chemiluminescence reaction is the cause of in vivo bioluminescence. In the fungus, the level of activity of the enzyme superoxide dismutase (SOD) appears to play a critical role in the amount of light emission. SOD quenches the effect of the superoxide (O_{2}^{−}) anion required in the reaction, and thus SOD activity has to be inhibited for the reaction to occur.

== Distribution, habitat, and ecology ==
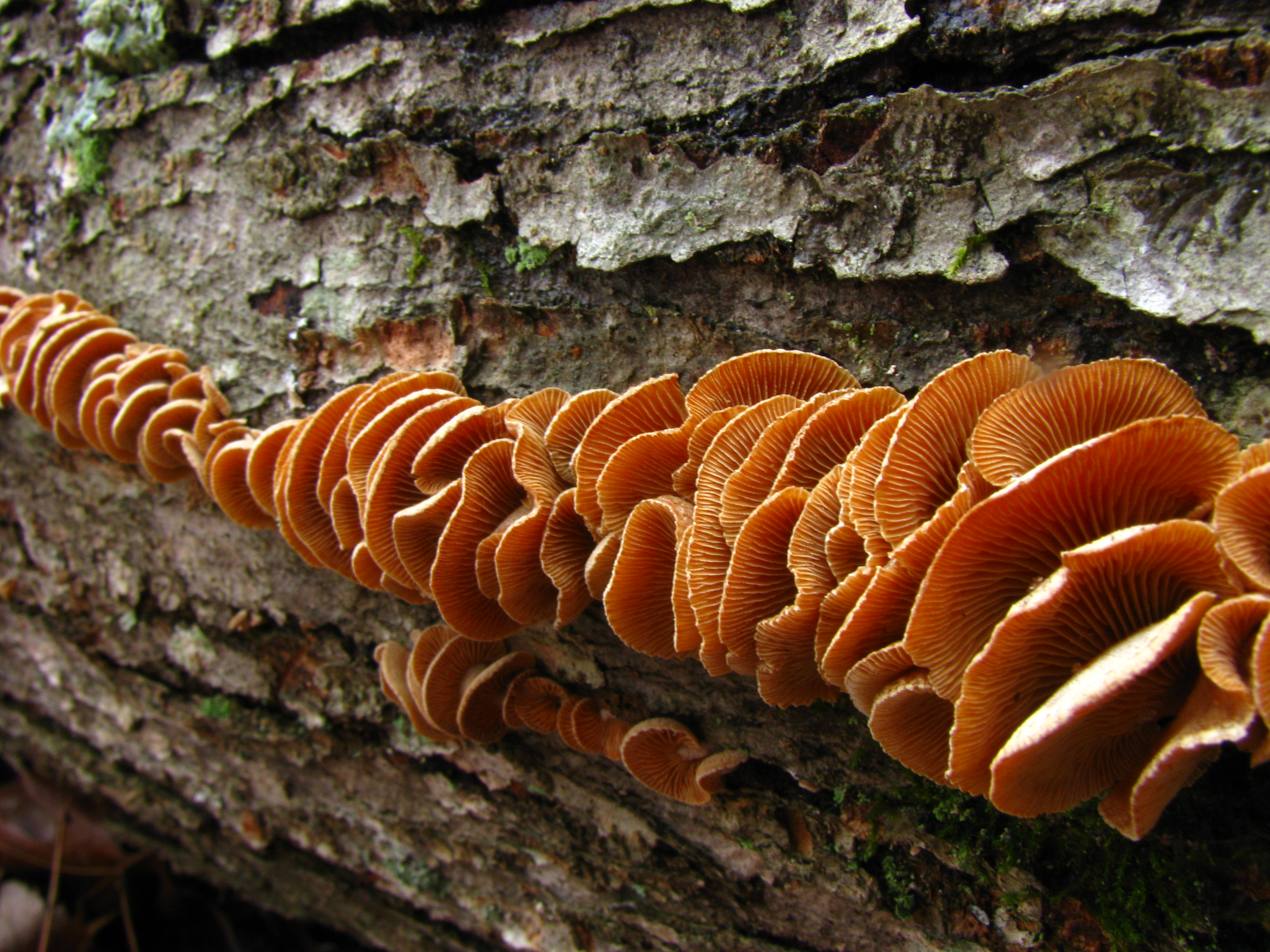
Fruit bodies can grow in dense overlapping clusters.

Panellus stipticus is common in northern temperate regions of Europe, and has also been collected in Australia, New Zealand, Anatolia, Japan, and China. In North America, it is more common in the east than the west; the mushroom's northern range extends to Alaska, and it has been collected as far south as Costa Rica.

Panellus stipticus is a saprobic species, and causes a white rot. This is a form of wood decay in which the wood assumes a bleached appearance and where lignin as well as cellulose and hemicellulose is broken down by enzymes secreted by the fungus. Fruit bodies are usually found in tightly overlapping clusters on the sides of hardwood trees, on logs, stumps, and fallen branches. Although most commonly found on dead wood, it can also grow opportunistically in the wounds of living trees. In North America, its preferred hosts are oak, birch, maple, hickory, pecan, and American hornbeam, while in Europe, it is commonly found growing on oak, birch, alder, beech, hazel, chestnut, and ash. It has also been found growing on Ericia in North Africa. Although the fungus favors hardwoods, it has been reported to grow on loblolly pine and eastern white pine. Fruiting occurs September through November in Europe, the Canary Islands, and North America, although it may also sometimes be found in the spring. The fruit bodies are long-lasting and may be found year-round. It is an "early-stage" succession fungus, not typically recorded from plantations over 20 years old.

The fruit bodies are frequently attacked by slugs, which may be important agents in the dispersal of its spores. White-tailed deer are also known to consume the fungus.

== Uses ==
Panellus stipticus is considered too small and bitter to be edible, but is considered nonpoisonous. Its taste has been described as acidic, acrid, or astringent. One 1992 study reported that the taste of the fruit bodies varies across the geographic range of the species. Those from eastern North America have a mildly acrid taste that takes time to develop, and cause uncomfortable drying in the mouth. In contrast, specimens from Japan, New Zealand, and Russia produce no sensation in the mouth, but cause significant constriction and a nauseating taste in the throat. The fruit bodies are reputed to have been used in traditional Chinese medicine as a styptic to staunch bleeding, and also as a "violent purgative".

=== Bioremediation ===
As a white-rot fungus, P. stipticus contains enzymes that are able to break down lignin, a complex aromatic polymer in wood that is highly resistant to degradation by conventional enzyme systems. The major enzyme that initiates the cleavage of hydrocarbon rings is laccase, which catalyzes the addition of a hydroxyl group to phenolic compounds (polyphenols). The ring can then be opened between the two adjacent carbon atoms that bear the hydroxyl groups. White-rot fungi are being investigated scientifically for their potential use in the bioremediation of land contaminated by organic pollutants, and to convert industrial wastes rich in toxic polyphenols. Panellus stipticus has been shown to reduce the phenolic concentration of waste water produced by olive-processing plants—an environmental concern in many Mediterranean countries. In this study, a liquid culture of P. stipticus mycelia reduced the initial concentration of phenolic compounds by 42% after a 31-day incubation period. In a separate study, a P. stipticus culture was able to effectively degrade the environmental pollutant 2,7-dichlorodibenzo-p-dioxin, a polychlorinated dioxin.

== See also ==
- List of bioluminescent fungi
