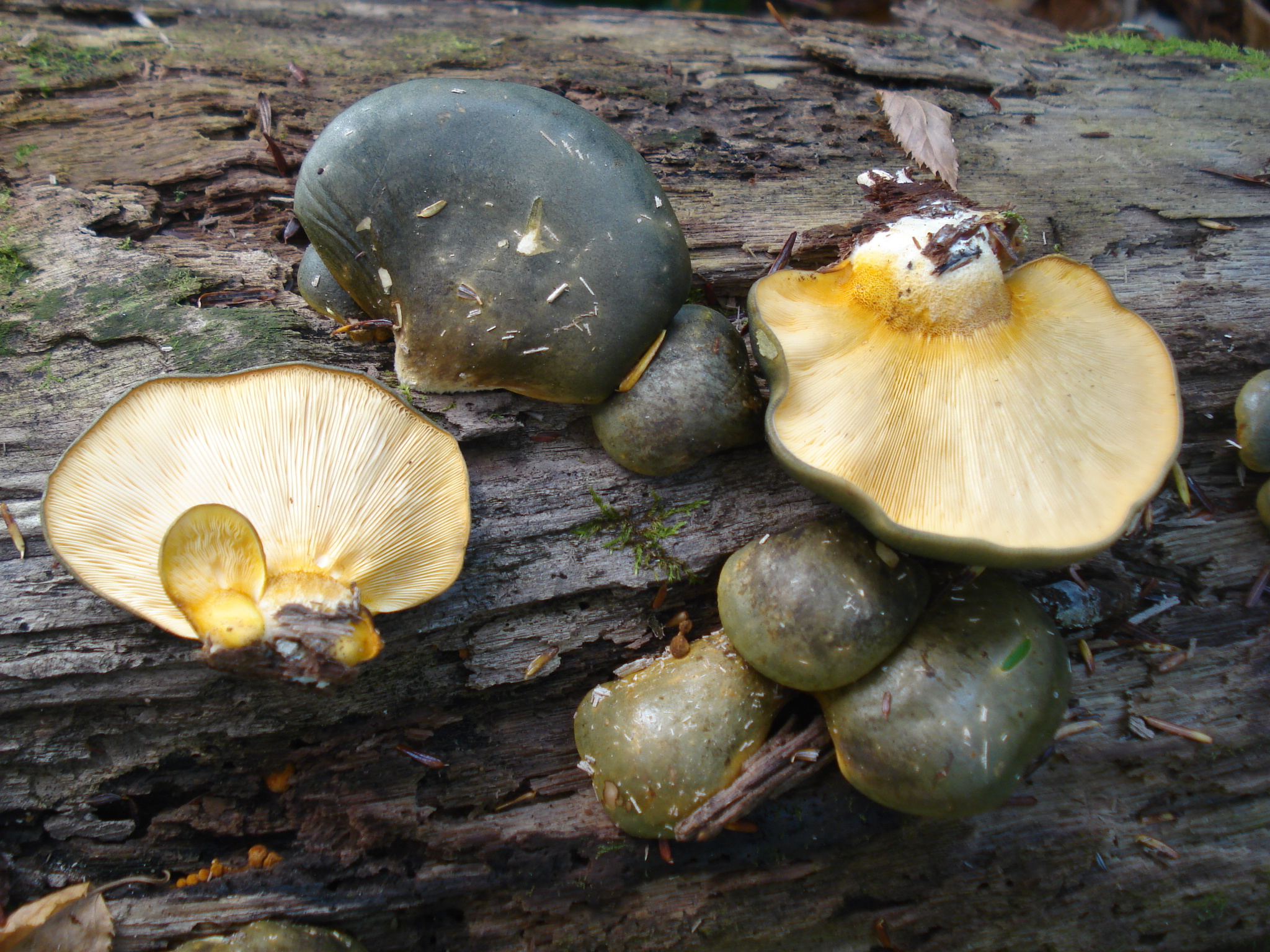

Scientific classification
- Kingdom: Fungi
- Division: Basidiomycota
- Class: Agaricomycetes
- Order: Agaricales
- Family: Sarcomyxaceae
- Genus: Sarcomyxa
- Species: S. serotina

Binomial name
- Sarcomyxa serotina (Pers.) P. Karst. (1891)

Synonyms
- Agaricus serotinus Pers. (1793); Pleurotus serotinus (Pers.) P.Kumm. (1871); Acanthocystis serotinus (Pers.) Konrad & Maubl. (1937); Hohenbuehelia serotina (Pers.) Singer (1951); Panellus serotinus (Pers.) Kühner (1950); Panus serotinus (Pers.) Kühner (1980)

= Sarcomyxa serotina =

Species of fungus

Sarcomyxa serotina
- Mycological characteristics
- Gills on hymenium
- Cap is convex
- Hymenium is adnate or decurrent
- Stipe is bare or lacks a stipe
- Spore print is yellow
- Ecology is saprotrophic
- Edibility is edible

Sarcomyxa serotina is a species of fungus in the family Sarcomyxaceae. Its recommended English name in the UK is olive oysterling. In North America it is known as late fall oyster or late oyster mushroom.

== Description ==
The fruit bodies predominately comprise greenish, overlapping fan- or oyster-shaped caps. The caps are up to 9 centimetres (3 1/2 in) wide. The gills on the underside are closely spaced, bright orange yellow, and have an adnate to decurrent attachment to the short and stout stem. The spores are smooth, amyloid, and measure 4–6 by 1–2 μm; they produce a cream to yellow spore print.

== Habitat ==
It grows on fallen hardwood and sometimes conifers in cold weather in North America, serving as an indicator that the mushroom season is nearly over.

== Uses ==
The species is considered to be either edible but not choice or inedible, with a flavour ranging from mild to bitter. Research has revealed that two separate species exist, Sarcomyxa serotina and S. edulis (unknown in Europe). The latter is cultivated for food in China and Japan.
