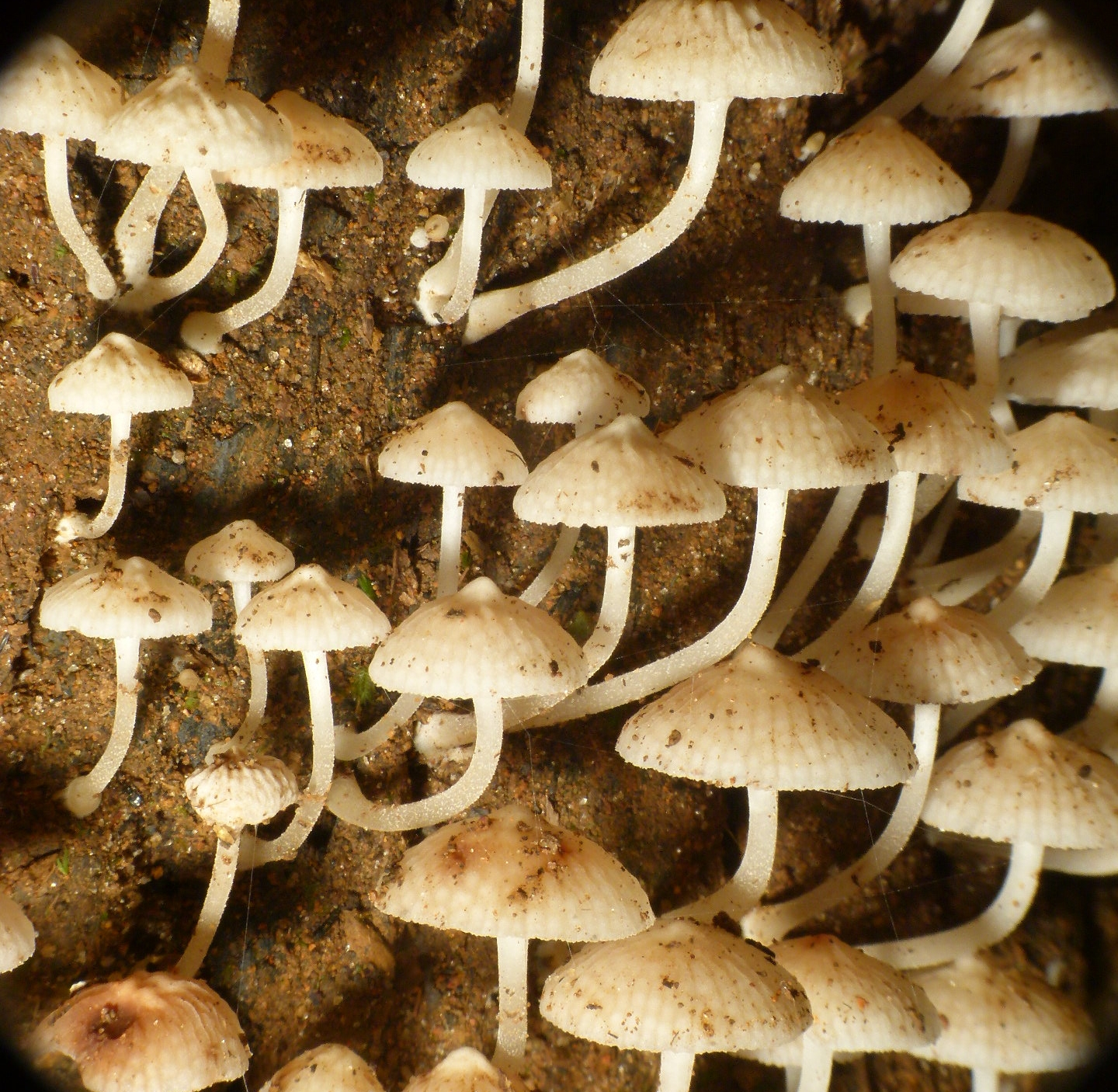

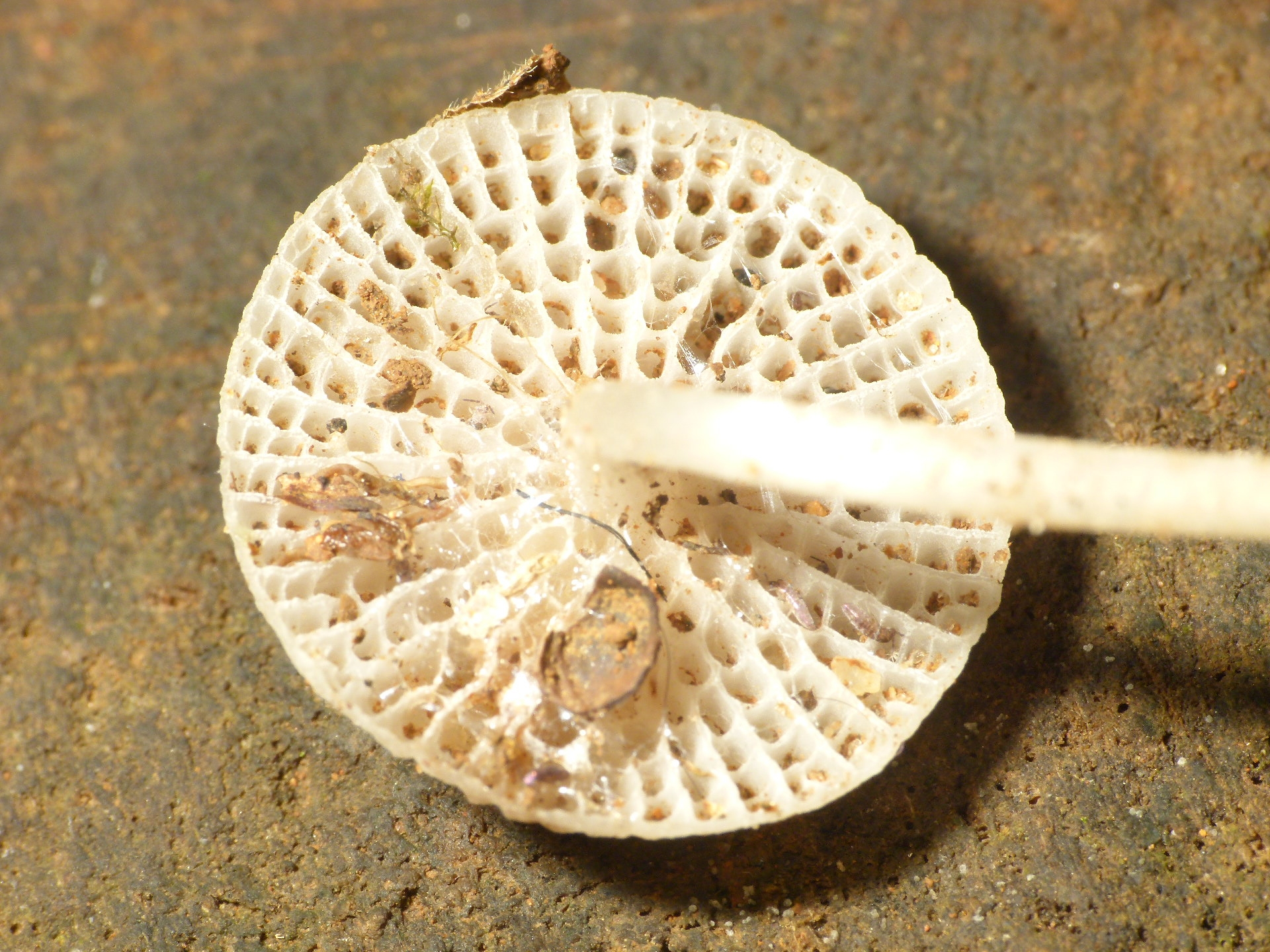

Scientific classification
- Domain: Eukaryota
- Kingdom: Fungi
- Division: Basidiomycota
- Class: Agaricomycetes
- Order: Agaricales
- Family: Mycenaceae
- Genus: Filoboletus
- Species: F. manipularis

Binomial name
- Filoboletus manipularis (Berk.) Sacc. (1887)

Synonyms
- Favolus manipularis Berk. (1854); Laschia caespitosa var. manipularis (Berk.) Sacc. (1888); Laschia manipularis (Berk.) Sacc. (1888) "Mycena manipularis" (Berk.) Sacc. 1887; Poromycena manipularis (Berk.) R.Heim (1945); Favolaschia manipularis (Berk.) Teng (1963)

= Filoboletus manipularis =

Species of fungus

Filoboletus manipularis is a species of agaric fungus in the family Mycenaceae. Found in Australasia, Malaysia, and the Pacific islands, the mycelium and fruit bodies of the fungus grow in forests and can be bioluminescent. The fruiting bodies also display a variety of morphologies that have no current genetic attributions. References to Filoboletus manipularis can be found in Japanese folklore and Indonesian food culture.

== Appearance ==
Filoboletus manipularis is a macrofungus, so it disperses its spores using fruiting bodies. Fruiting bodies are typically clustered together and have similar morphologies. Differences in morphology are generally seen between different clusters. The clustered fruiting bodies have few, if any, distinct differences. The observed morphological variants have not been attributed to any genetic variations.

=== Pileus (Cap) ===
The shape of the pileus in Filoboletus manipularis displays quite a bit of variation with cone-shaped, flattened, umbonate, depressed, and convex caps being observed. The underside of the pileus has pores, rather than gills, where spores are grown and dispersed.

=== Size ===
The size of the fungus's pileus ranges from about half-a-centimeter to about six centimeters in diameter. The stipes (stalk) size ranges from two to seven centimeters long.

=== Coloration ===
The coloration of Filoboletus manipularis changes depending on its maturation state. At maturity, the fruiting bodies have white or beige coloration. During maturation, however, the fruiting body - or basidiomata - can also have brown or pink coloration. The visibility of any brown or pink coloration decreases as the fruiting body matures, giving way to the more known white and beige appearance.

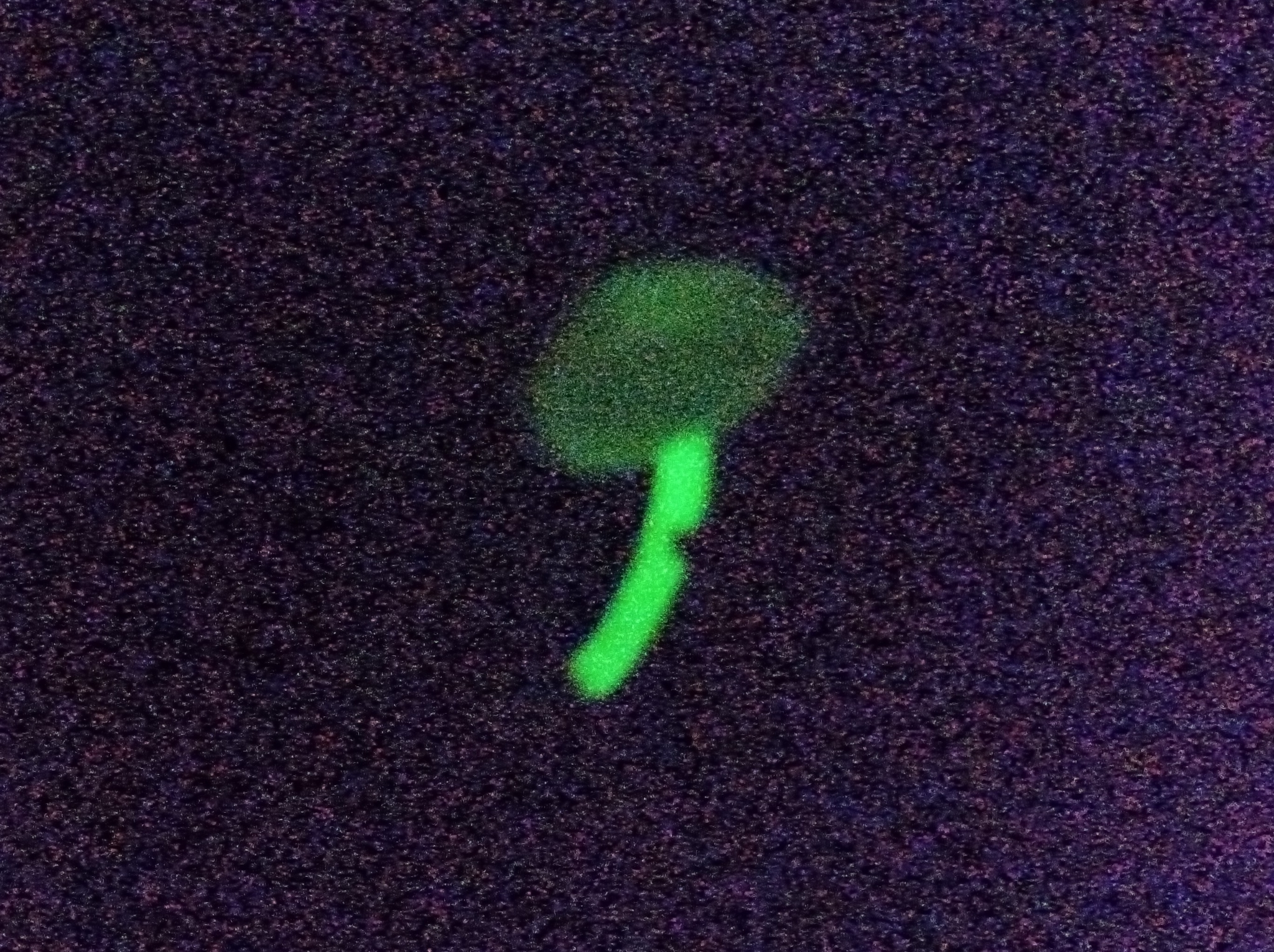
A fruit body of Filoboletus manipularis where the entire fruit body is displaying bioluminescence.

=== Bioluminescence ===
The bioluminescence of Filoboletus manipularis is not uniform, with non-luminescent or weakly luminescent strains being reported on Okinawa Island and in Vietnam. This variation, currently, does not have any correlation to the observed morphological variants or to genetic differences. Although, it has been posited that these variations could be attributed to environmental changes. The known variations of its bioluminescence include having the pileus- the whole cap or just the porous underside, stipe, the entire fruiting body, or none of the fruiting body displaying bioluminescence.

When bioluminescence is observed, the fruiting body emits typically 595 photons of green light - making it visible to the human eye.

== Habitat ==
Filoboletus manipularis populations are found in tropical regions of Asia, Australia and the Pacific Islands. Fruit body clusters are typically found in forests on rotted or rotting wood.

Currently, Filoboletus manipularis is considered endangered in the Chiba Prefecture of Japan. But, in the Miyazaki Prefecture, it has been listed as "near threatened".

== Culture ==
=== Japan ===
Referred to as "reticulated luminous mushroom" or Ami-hikari-také in Japan, Filoboletus manipularis has integrated itself into Japanese folklore. Fungal bioluminescence, specifically in the post-Edo period, was considered unsettling or "eerie" because people thought that it was caused by Yōkai - supernatural creatures. The bioluminescence displayed by fungi was referred to as Mino-bi - which is translated to raincoat fire. This term was associated with the fungi that grew on rotting wood and straw raincoats.

=== Indonesia ===
"Kalut gadong putih" is the local name for Filoboletus manipularis and it is typically gathered by local tribes and sold at market as a nutrient dense food source.

== See also ==
- List of bioluminescent fungi
