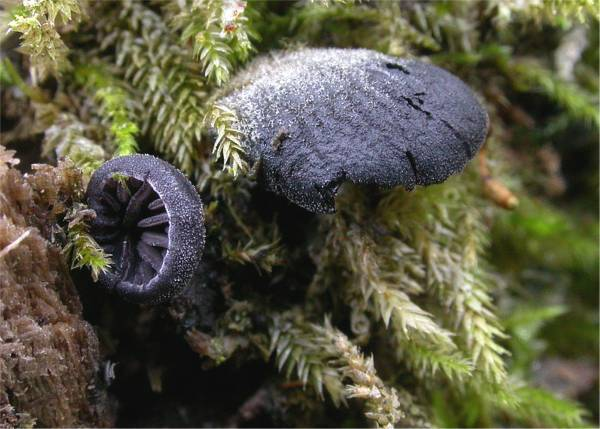
- Resupinatus applicatus

Scientific classification
- Kingdom: Fungi
- Division: Basidiomycota
- Class: Agaricomycetes
- Order: Agaricales
- Family: Resupinataceae
- Genus: Resupinatus; Gray

Type species
- Resupinatus applicatus (Batsch) Gray

Synonyms
- List: Asterotus Singer 1943; Marasmius sect. Pleurotopsis Henn. 1898; Phyllotremella Lloyd 1920; Phyllotus P. Karst. 1879; Pleurotopsis (Henn.) Earle 1909; Rhodocyphella W.B. Cooke 1961; Stigmatolemma Kalchbr. 1882; Stromatocyphella W.B. Cooke 1961; Scytinotopsis Singer 1936; Urceolus Velen. 1939

= Resupinatus =

Genus of fungi

Resupinatus is a genus of fungi in the family Resupinataceae, of which it is the only member. Species are saprobic, and often found growing on the underside of decaying wood or sides of decaying woody substrates. The generic name is derived from the Latin resupinus (bent backward, inverted).

== Description ==
Species in this genus have small fruiting bodies, typically less than 1.5 cm in diameter. Basidiocarps are pleurotoid or cyphelloid in shape, meaning they have a reduced stem, and a flattened cap that is kidney-shaped or circular when viewed from above. Gills are well-developed and radiate outwards from an off-center point of origin or lacking.

== Species ==
The following species are recognised in the genus Resupinatus:

- Resupinatus alboniger Singer 1978
- Resupinatus americanus Consiglio & Setti 2018
- Resupinatus applicatus Gray 1821 - smoked oysterling
- Resupinatus cinereus (Pat.) J.V. McDonald & Thorn 2019
- Resupinatus cinerascens Grgur. 1997
- Resupinatus conglobatus (Burt) J.V. McDonald & Thorn 2019
- Resupinatus conspersus (Pers.) Thorn, Moncalvo & Redhead 2006
- Resupinatus crawfordii G. Stev. 1964
- Resupinatus cupuliformis (Berk. & Ravenel) J.V. McDonald & Thorn 2019
- Resupinatus cyatheae Corner 1996
- Resupinatus daedalea (Schwein.) J.V. McDonald & Thorn 2019
- Resupinatus dorotheae G. Stev. 1964
- Resupinatus europaeus Consiglio & Setti 2018
- Resupinatus graminum Singer 1973
- Resupinatus hausknechtii Consiglio & Setti 2017
- Resupinatus huia Thorn, Moncalvo & Redhead 2006
- Resupinatus hyalinus (Singer) Thorn, Moncalvo & Redhead 2006
- Resupinatus incanus (Kalchbr.) Thorn, Moncalvo & Redhead 2006
- Resupinatus kavinii (Pilát) M.M. Moser 1978
- Resupinatus lanatiechinatus Lib.-Barnes 1981
- Resupinatus leightonii (Berk.) P.D. Orton 1960 - contains bioactive compounds with cytotoxic activity.
- Resupinatus merulioides Redhead & Nagas. 1987
- Resupinatus multilamellatus Corner 1996
- Resupinatus niger (Schwein.) Murrill 1915
- Resupinatus odoratus C.K. Pradeep, C. Bijeesh & A.M. Kumar 2020
- Resupinatus omphalioides Singer 1965
- Resupinatus orizabensis Murrill 1915
- Resupinatus pahangensis Corner 1996
- Resupinatus physaroides Malençon 1975
- Resupinatus plectocomiae Corner 1996
- Resupinatus poriaeformis (Pers.) Thorn, Moncalvo & Redhead 2006
- Resupinatus porosus M.P. Martín, Lodge & Thorn 2005
- Resupinatus rasilis Lib.-Barnes 1981
- Resupinatus rickii Trierv.-Per. & Thorn 2019
- Resupinatus rouxii Consiglio & Setti 2018
- Resupinatus rubrhacodium Singer 1952
- Resupinatus stictoideus (Speg.) Nakasone
- Resupinatus striatulus (Pers.) Murrill 1915
- Resupinatus stuntzii Lib.-Barnes & Largent 1981
- Resupinatus subbarbatulus Murril 1915
- Resupinatus subrhacodium Singer 1952
- Resupinatus subvinaceus Corner 1996
- Resupinatus taxi (Lév.) Thorn, Moncalvo & Redhead 2006
- Resupinatus trichotis (Pers.) Singer 1961 - characterized by thick, rigid hairs at the center of the pileus.
- Resupinatus tristis G. Stev. 1964
- Resupinatus urceolatus (Wallr. ex Fr.) Thorn, Moncalvo & Redhead 2006
- Resupinatus urceoloides J.V. McDonald & Thorn 2019
- Resupinatus vinosolividus (Segedin) J.A. Cooper 2012
- Resupinatus violaceogriseus G. Stev. 1964
