= Dogwood (disambiguation) =

Dogwood is a common name for trees and shrubs in the temperate Northern Hemisphere genus Cornus.

Dogwood may also refer to:

== Other plants ==
- Acacia coriacea, a species in the family Fabaceae native to northern Australia
- Bedfordia salicina, a species in the family Asteraceae native to Tasmania
- Beilschmiedia oligandra, a species in the family Lauraceae native to Queensland
- Cassinia aculeata, a species in the family Asteraceae native to Tasmania and southeastern Australia
- Ceratopetalum virchowii, a species in the family Cunoniaceae native to Queensland
- Eremophila bignoniiflora, a species in the family Scrophulariaceae occurring on floodplains throughout Australia
- Eremophila longifolia, a species in the family Scrophulariaceae native to Australia
- Jacksonia scoparia, a species in the family Fabaceae native to eastern Australia
- Ozothamnus diosmifolius (white dogwood), a species in the family Asteraceae native to eastern Australia
- Piscidia piscipula, known as Jamaican dogwood, a species in the family Fabaceae native to the Caribbean
- Pomaderris apetala, a species in the family Rhamnaceae native to Tasmania
- Pomaderris aspera, a species in the family Rhamnaceae native to southeastern Australia
- Pomaderris elliptica (yellow dogwood), a species in the family Rhamnaceae native to southeastern Australia and Tasmania
- Solanum dulcamara, a species of vine in the family Solanaceae native to Europe and Asia
- Vachellia bidwillii, a species in the family Fabaceae native to northern Australia

== Places ==
In the United States

- Dogwood, Indiana, an unincorporated community
- Dogwood, Kentucky, an unincorporated community
- Dogwood, Douglas County, Missouri, an unincorporated community
- Dogwood, Mississippi County, Missouri, an unincorporated community

Elsewhere

- Dogwood Creek (disambiguation)
- Dogwood Point, the southernmost point of Saint Kitts and Nevis

== Sports ==
- Dogwood Stakes, an annual American Thoroughbred horse race at Churchill Downs racetrack in Louisville, Kentucky
- Miller 500 (Busch race), a NASCAR stock car race held at Martinsville Speedway, in Martinsville, Virginia from 1982 to 1994, known as the Dogwood 500 in the first year
- Dogwood Invitational an amateur golf tournament played annually in Atlanta, Georgia

== Other ==
- USCGC Dogwood (WAGL-259), a US Coast Guard river tender
- Forward Operating Base Dogwood, a US military facility in Iraq from 2004 to 2005
- Dogwood (California band), a Christian punk band
  - Dogwood (album), self-released in 1998
- Dogwood (Alabama band), an American country rock band
- British Columbia Certificate of Graduation, also known as a Dogwood Diploma or Adult Dogwood, a graduation diploma in British Columbia high schools
- Dogwood, the literary journal of Fairfield University
- Dogwood, a Virginia news website owned by Courier Newsroom
- Dogwood Initiative, a Canadian advocacy group

== See also ==
- Dagwood (disambiguation)
