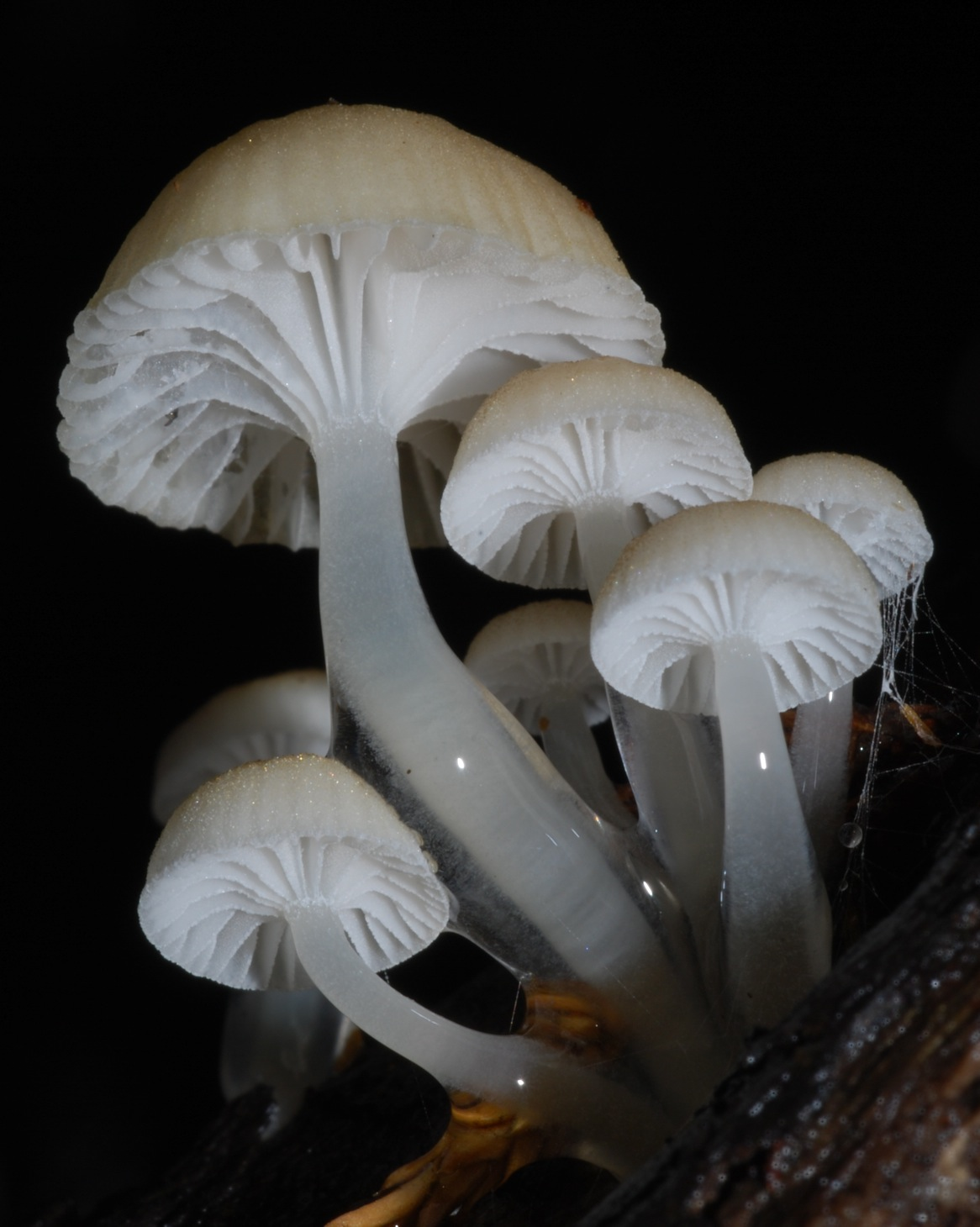

Scientific classification
- Domain: Eukaryota
- Kingdom: Fungi
- Division: Basidiomycota
- Class: Agaricomycetes
- Order: Agaricales
- Family: Mycenaceae
- Genus: Roridomyces
- Species: R. austrororidus

Binomial name
- Roridomyces austrororidus (Singer) Rexer (1994)

Synonyms
- Mycena austrororida Singer (1962); Mycena veronicae Stevenson (1964)

= Roridomyces austrororidus =

Species of fungus

Roridomyces austrororidus Mycological characteristics
- Gills on hymenium
- Cap is convex or conical
- Hymenium is adnate
- Stipe is bare
- Spore print is white
- Ecology is saprotrophic
- Edibility is inedible

Roridomyces austrororidus, commonly known as the austro dripping bonnet, is a species of agaric fungus in the family Mycenaceae. Described as new to science in 1962 by American mycologist Rolf Singer, it is found in South America, New Zealand, and Australia, where it grows on rotting wood.

The fruit bodies (mushrooms) have several distinguishing characteristics that facilitate identification, including thick, white, mucilaginous stipes, and white to pale cream, convex caps that measure 1–2 cm (0.4–0.8 in). The gills are white, widely spaced, and have a fused or decurrent attachment to the stipe. Spores are smooth, ellipsoid, and measure about 9–15 by 6–9 micrometres. The smooth and white stipes are 4–6 cm (1.6–2.4 in) long and 0.1–0.2 cm (0.04–0.08 in) thick, and covered with a thick coating of gluten.

== Taxonomy, naming, and classification ==
The species was first described as Mycena austrororida by mycologist Rolf Singer in 1962, based on specimens he collected from Masatierra, in the Juan Fernandez Islands, Chile. Karl-Heinz Rexer transferred it to the newly circumscribed genus Roridomyces in his 1994 doctoral thesis. The name Mycena veronicae, published by New Zealand mycologist Greta Stevenson in 1964, is a synonym of M. austrororida.

The mushroom is commonly known as the "austro dripping bonnet". The specific epithet combines the Latin words austro (from australis, "south") and roridus ("wet with dew").

== Description ==
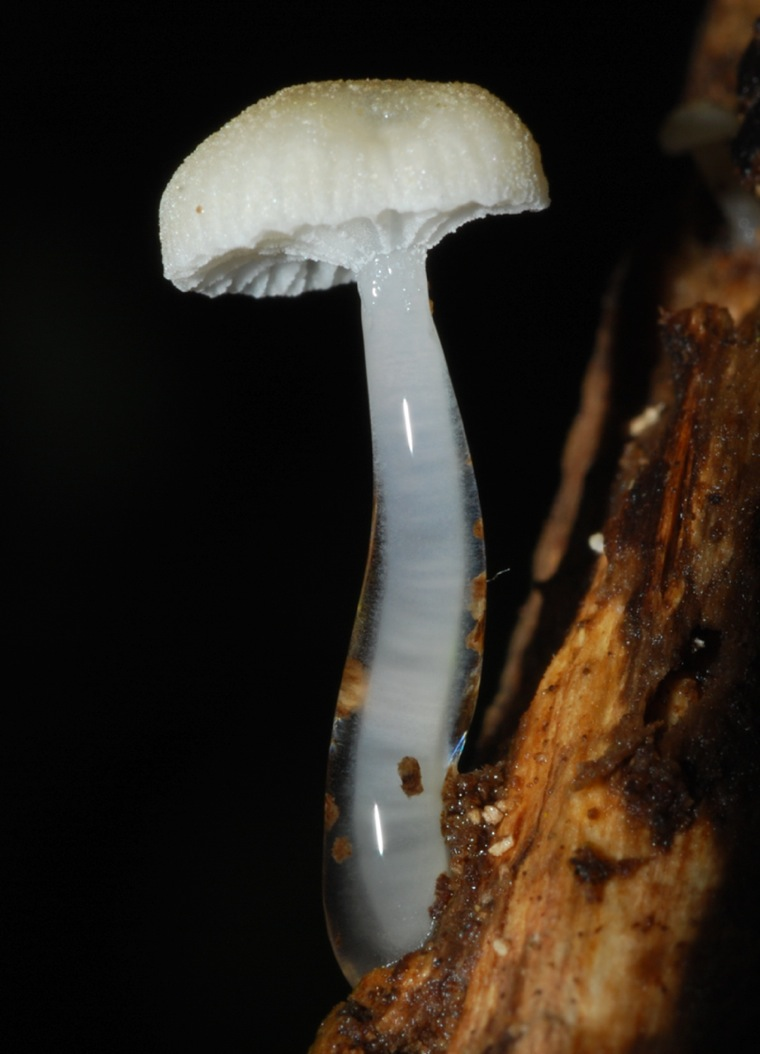
The mucilaginous stipe is a characteristic feature

The cap is shallowly convex to convex or irregularly convex, and with or without a shallow umbo, measuring up to 16 mm (0.63 in) in diameter and up to 5 mm (0.2 in) high. The cap margin is curved downward, sometimes slightly flared, and sometimes has translucent radial striations marking the positions of the gills underneath. The white flesh—thickest at the center of the cap—tapers gradually to the margin. The gills are broadly adnate (fused) to decurrent (running down the length of the stipe). The gill edges are either smooth and even, or may have minute teeth. The gills are well-spaced, with 16 to 24 gills extending fully from the cap margin to the stipe, and two or three tiers of interspersed lamellulae (short gills that do not extend fully from the cap margin to the stipe). The smooth, cylindrical stipe is up to 27 mm (1.1 in) long, and up to 2.5 mm (0.1 in) in diameter at the base, narrowing towards the top. It is hollow, silky to shiny, and mucilaginous—usually with thick slime at the base. Sometimes, there are short white hairs at the bottom of the stipe, although their presence is variable. The mushroom has no distinctive odor.

Spores are roughly ellipsoidal in shape with a Q ratio (the fraction of length/width) of 1.6, and dimensions of 9.4–15.4 by 6.2–9.0 μm. They have a small, oblique apiculus, lack oil droplets, and are smooth with thin walls, and hyaline (translucent). The spores are acyanophilous and strongly amyloid, meaning they stain with Methyl blue and Melzer's reagent, respectively. The basidia (spore-bearing cells) are four-spored (rarely two-spored) and club-shaped with long, robust sterigmata up to 6.0 μm long; they have clamp connections at their bases, and measure 35.3–49.6 by 10.3–14.4 μm. Roridomyces austrororidus has two types of cheilocystidia (cystidia on gill edges). One is rare, broadly club-shaped, and tapers to a narrow stem; it measures 24.1–39.5 by 6.8–12.7 μm. The other cheilocystidia are moderately dense to abundant, and form a sterile gill edge. They are cylindrical, measuring 27.5–70.4 by 5.4–10.4 μm, and often have a swollen tip that splits into two, rarely three branches.

=== Similar species ===
The African species Roridomyces mauritianus is similar in appearance to R. austrororidus, but can be distinguished by the brownish cap, and microscopically by its smaller spores (measuring 7–8 by 3.5–4.0 μm), and its shorter (25–40 μm), club-shaped basidia.

== Habitat and distribution ==
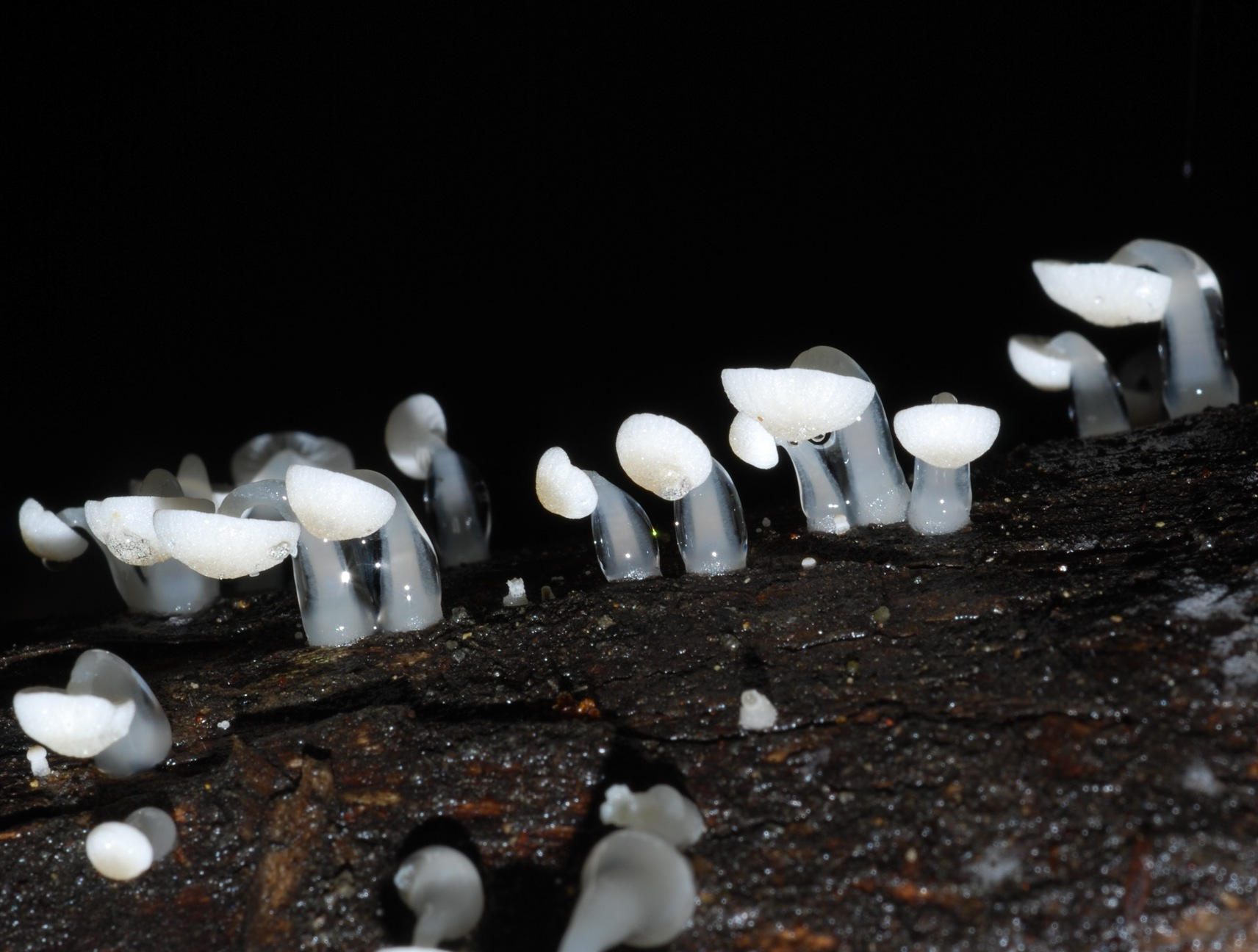
Fruit bodies grow on decaying wood.

Like all members of its genus, Roridomyces austrororidus grows as a saprophyte on rotting wood. In Australia, the fungus fruits in clusters or groups on rainforest trees, decayed logs, fallen Eucalyptus branches, Bedfordia salicina logs and branches, and Nothofagus cunninghamii logs. Fruiting usually occurs after rainy periods from April to June, although the mushroom has also been collected in August. New Zealand collections have been reported to grow on Pinus, Leptospermum, and Ripogonum. A study of fungal succession in a wet eucalypt forest in Tasmania demonstrated that R. austrororidus prefers mature forests (with at least 70 years of growth since the last wildfire), and fruits on small diameter wood—typically twigs with a width less than 15 mm (0.6 in).

Roridomyces austrororidus occurs in Argentina, Chile, New Zealand, and Australia. Its Australian distribution includes Queensland, New South Wales, Victoria, Tasmania and Western Australia. Australian mycologist Tony Young suggests that the geographical distribution of the fungus indicates that its ancestor may have originated from the ancient continent Gondwana.
