= Flannel leaf =

Flannel leaf is a common name for several plants and may refer to:

- Bedfordia arborescens, a shrub or small tree native to southeastern Australia
- Verbascum thapsus, a herbaceous plant native to Europe, Africa, and Asia and widely naturalized globally
