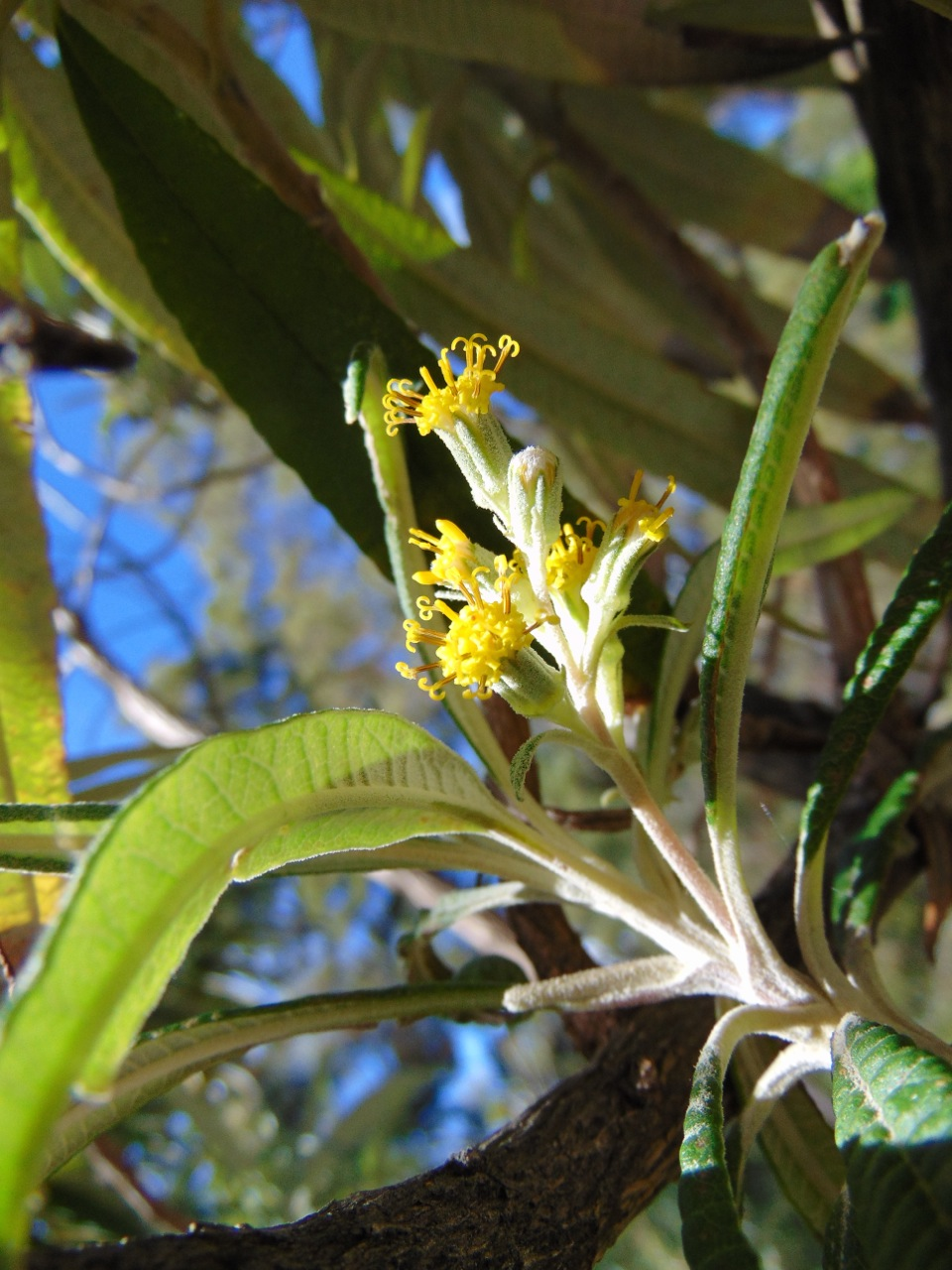
- Bright yellow inflorescence of Bedfordia salicina arising from leaf axil

Scientific classification
- Kingdom: Plantae
- Clade: Embryophytes
- Clade: Tracheophytes
- Clade: Spermatophytes
- Clade: Angiosperms
- Clade: Eudicots
- Clade: Asterids
- Order: Asterales
- Family: Asteraceae
- Genus: Bedfordia
- Species: B. salicina

Binomial name
- Bedfordia salicina DC.

= Bedfordia salicina =

Species of flowering plant

Bedfordia salicina, commonly known as Tasmanian blanketleaf, is an endemic angiosperm of Tasmania, Australia. It is widespread throughout wet sclerophyll forests, moist gullies and intermediate forests and woodlands between wet and dry sclerophyll communities. Bedfordia salicina is abundant at low elevations, on dolerite, sandstone and mudstone substrate, east of Tylers line. Alternating leaves droop down to blanket the stem, coining the species common name, blanketleaf.

== Description ==
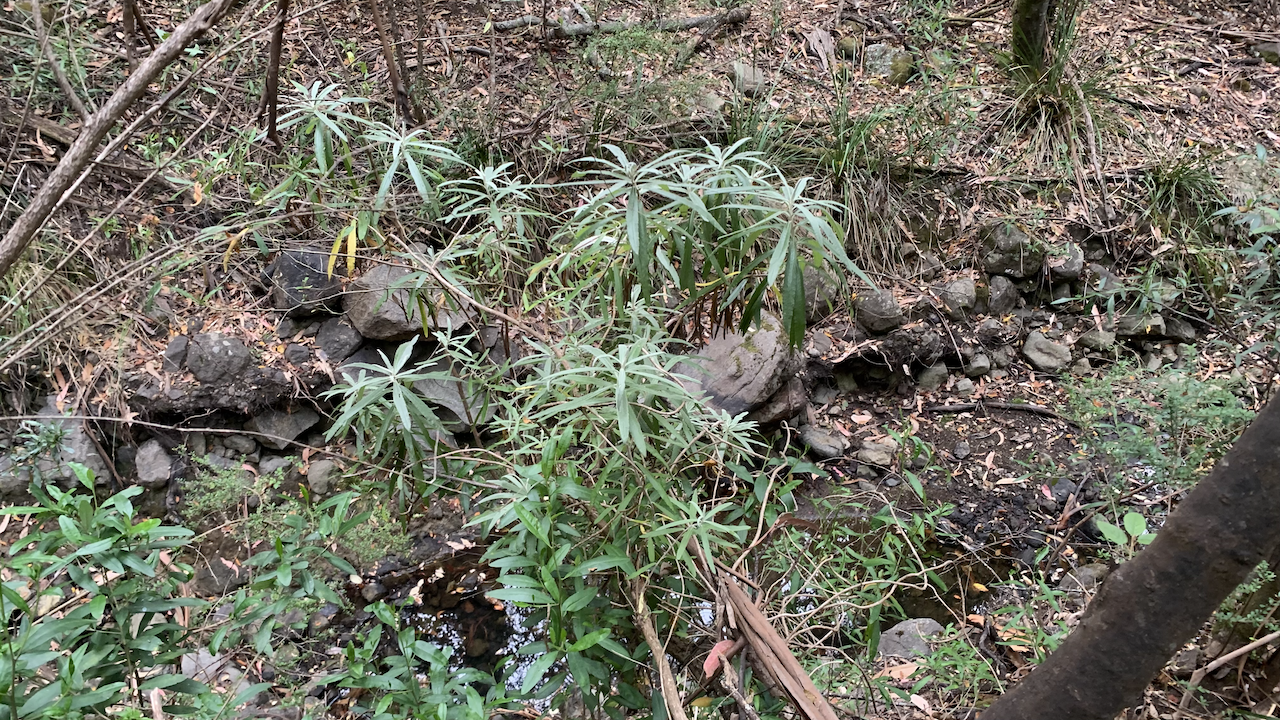
Typical wet gully habitat of Bedfordia salicina

Bedfordia salicina is a common large shrub or small tree, 2–5 m (6 ft 7 in – 16 ft 5 in) tall and 2–3 m (6 ft 7 in – 9 ft 10 in) wide, in the family Asteraceae. The central stem twists and bends in a mostly erect habit, with many lateral stems branching outwards and upward in a candelabra-like-fashion. Young wood of apical meristems are covered in silvery tomentum. Soft mesophyllic leaves have a dark green adaxial surface and a silvery abaxial covered in dense, matted, single layer of stellate hairs. Leaves are alternate and arise from very short petioles (up to 8 mm (0.31 in)), are long (60–150 mm (2.4–5.9 in)) and moderately broad (10–18 mm (0.39–0.71 in)), oblanceolate and undulate with prominent midrib and subtending veins and slightly revolute margins. Inflorescence an irregular panicle of 8-25 capitula which arise from the several upper leaf axils to form dense clusters of more than five bright yellow tubular disc florets and herbaceous phyllaries. Flowers October through to December. Fruits form an achene 3 mm (0.12 in) long through to March; old capitula remains year-round.

== Habitat and distribution ==
Bedfordia salicina is endemic to Tasmania, most common in eastern and central areas.

Found in the shrubby understorey of dry to wet sclerophyll forests and woodlands, commonly on highly fertile Jurassic Dolerite soils, although can also be found on a variety of rock types, from sea level to 1,000 m (3,300 ft) elevation.

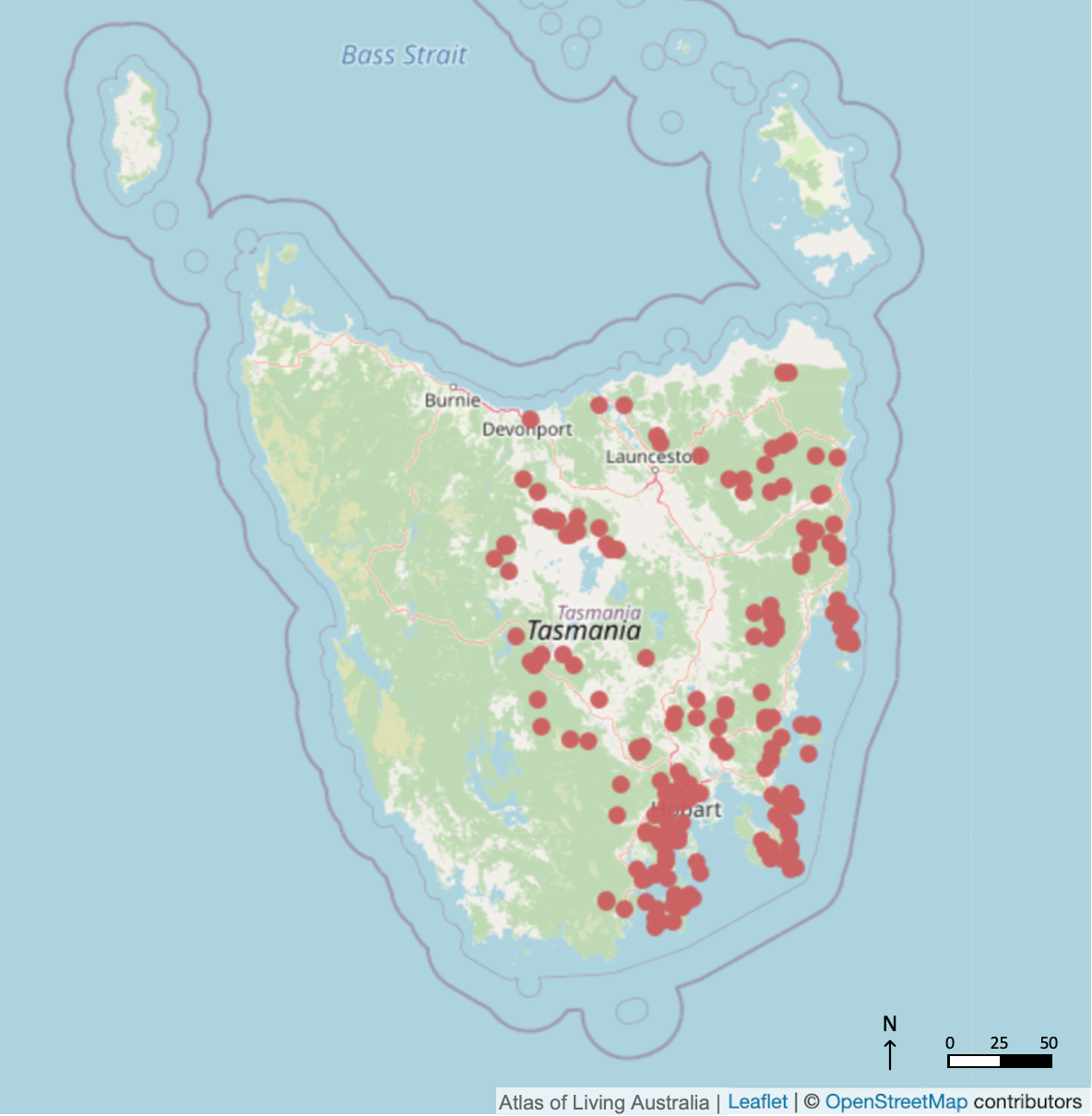
Bedfordia salicina current extent (including all data between 1950-present). File created using Atlas of Living Australia on 16 Feb 2022.

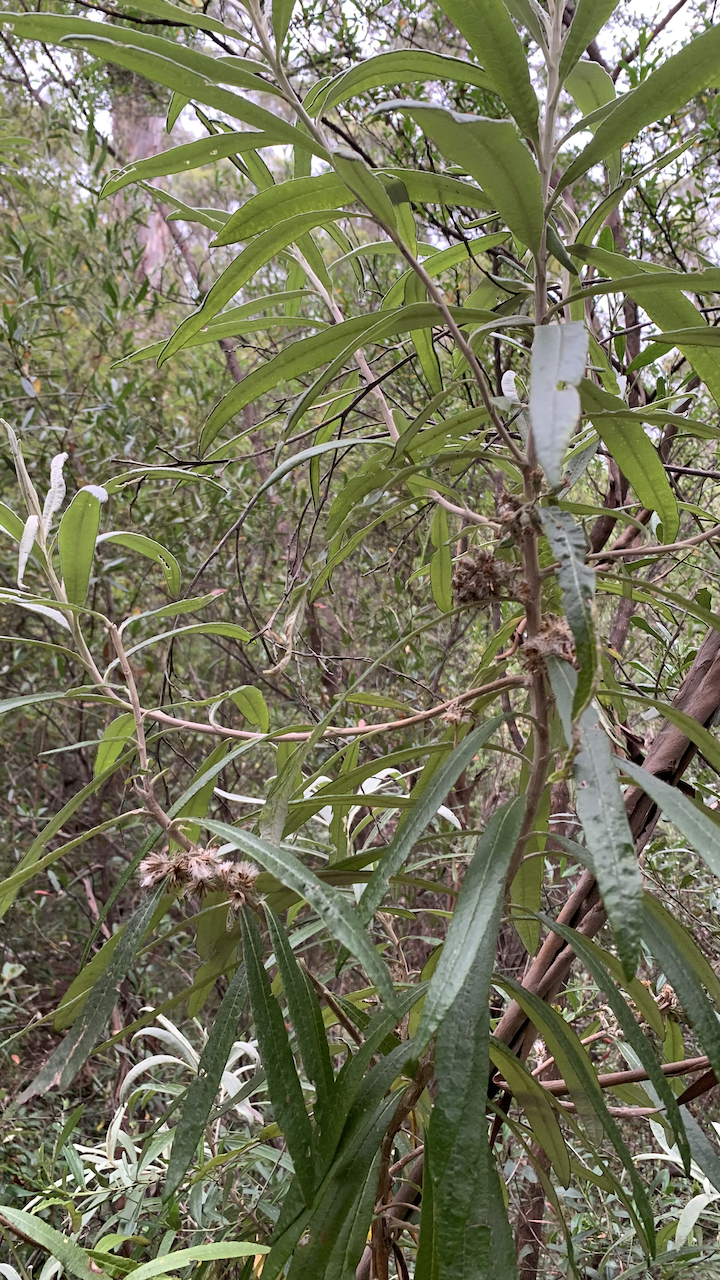
Showing the wiry candelabra stem habit of Bedfordia salicina

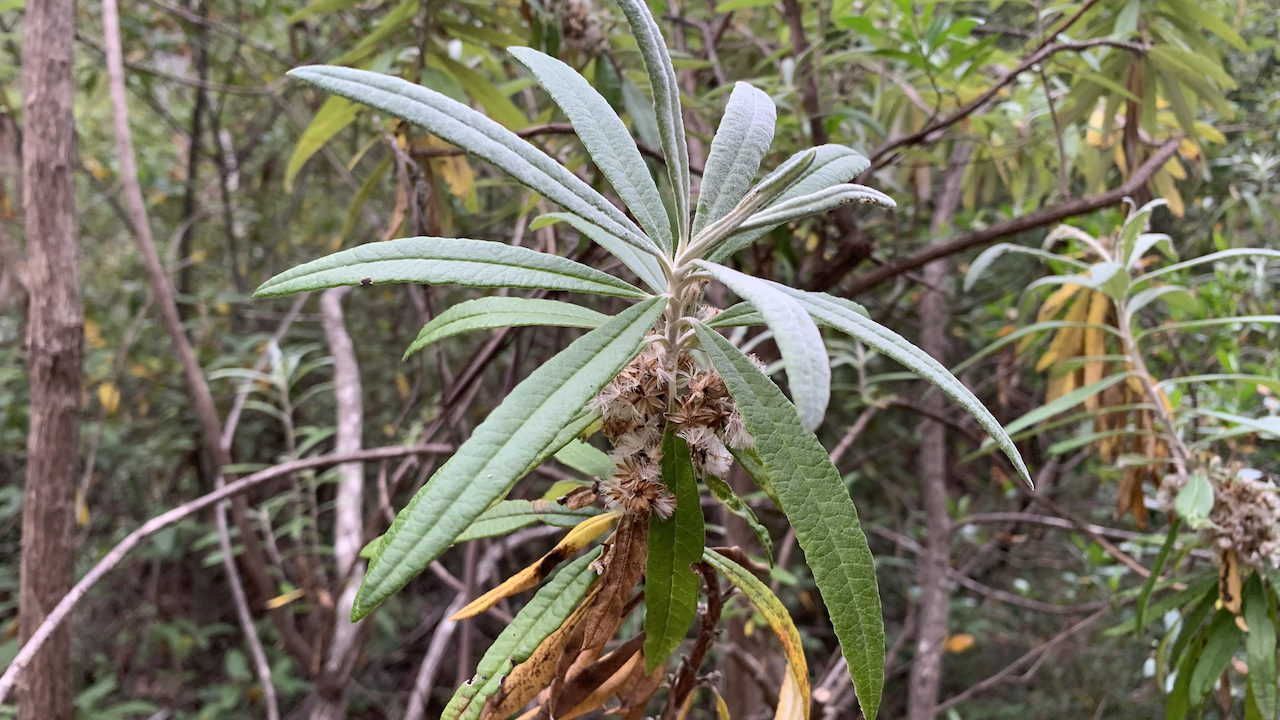
Apical meristem showing young wood with silvery tomentum and leaf habit

When found in dry sclerophyll forests, this species is often associated with Eucalyptus obliqua, Eucalyptus delegatensis, Eucalyptus globulus, Eucalyptus pulchella, Pomaderris apetala, Acacia dealbata, Acacia mucronata, Leptospermum lanigerum, Bursaria spinosa, Dodonaea viscosa, Olearia viscosa, Cyathodes glauca, Blechnum wattsii and Blechnum nudum. In addition to this, Bedfordia salicina can be found in the varying density, low-diversity shrub layer among Xanthorrhoea australis in Callitris dominated woodland with Eucalyptus globulus and Eucalyptus viminalis to 10 m (33 ft) tall. These woodlands occur in fire shadow sites, on dry, rocky dolerite substrate or boulder strewn shores with sandstone talus and slope deposits in south-east Tasmania. Bedfordia salicina can also be observed along the high energy coastline nearby Port Arthur, occurring alongside tussock grassland, heath and scrub on mudstone cliffs.

When found in wet sclerophyll forests, the canopy is often dominated by Eucalyptus obliqua and Eucalyptus regnan, below which stands Acacia melanoxylon, Acacia dealbata, and at the height of Bedfordia, you will also find Olearia argophylla, Nematolepis squamea and/or Pomaderris apetala, Pittosporum bicolor and Coprosma quadrifida.

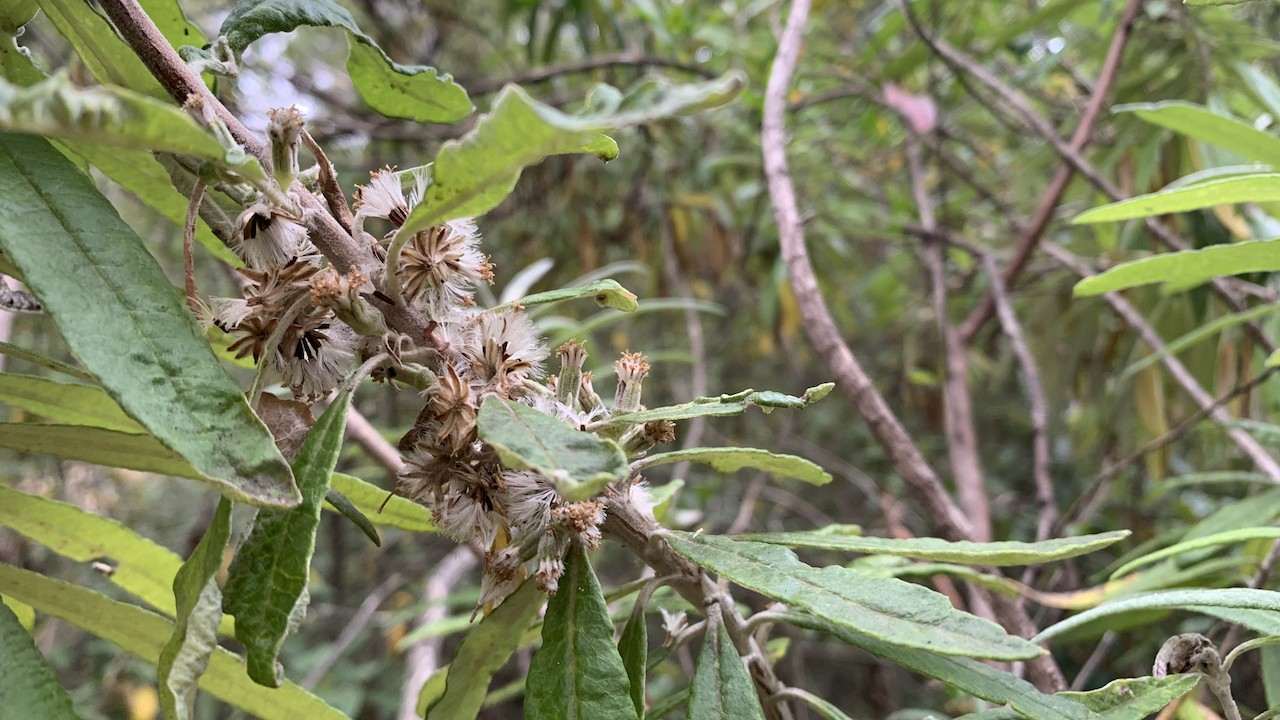
Inflorescence arise at leaf axils

== Fire ecology ==
Bedfordia salacina is found in sclerophyllous forests that are widely adapted to fire, while wetter environments have fire free periods up to 100 years, drier environments have fire free periods of 25–50 years. Bedfordia salicina has low propensity to propagate fire among wet sclerophyll and gully species and require considerable moisture loss before flaming can occur. When oven dried, Bedfordia salicina can reach 65-72% moisture loss from its initial weight, at which Bedfordia can both ignite and spread fire rapidly. Following fire, Bedfordia salicina have the capacity to regenerate vegetatively via lignotubers or seed.

== Animal ecology ==
Bedfordia salicina undergoes strong macropod browsing effects, particularly when preferred species such as Exocarpus cupressiformis and Bursaria spinosa supplies are absent or exhausted.

== Uses ==
Bedfordia salicina have several natural terpenoids, of which include sesquiterpenoids, diterpenoids, and cinnamate ester compounds.

== Threats and conservation ==
Bedfordia salicina conservation status has not been evaluated.

== Taxonomy ==
The genus Bedfordia was named in honour of horticulturalist and botanist, John Russell (1866-1839), sixth Duke of Bedford. There are three species belonging to the genus:

Species name (current and old):	Distribution:
Bedfordia arborescens Hochr.: Senecio bedfordii F.Muell	Eastern mainland Australia
Bedfordia linearis (Labill.) DC.: Cacalia linearis Labill.; Culcitium lineare (Labill.) Spreng.; Senecio billardierei F.Muell.	Endemic to Tasmania
Bedfordia salicina (Labill.) DC.: Cacalia salicina Labill.; Culcitium salicinum (Labill.) Spreng.	Endemic to Tasmania

The two species native to Tasmania can be distinguished by leaf shape and size. Bedfordia linearis has narrow linear leaves, 20–70 mm long, Bedfordia salicina has moderately broad oblanceolate leaves, 60–150 mm long. Bedfordia linearis and Bedfordia salicina are known to hybridise, resulting in intermediary characteristics between both species.
