= Tainui (disambiguation) =

Tainui may refer to:

- Tainui, a confederation of Māori iwi (tribes) in New Zealand
  - Waikato Tainui, often referred to as "Tainui", a constituent tribe of the abovementioned confederation
- Tainui, a Māori name for the shrub Pomaderris apetala
- Tainui (canoe), a Māori waka (migration canoe)
- Tainui, New Zealand, a suburb of Dunedin
- Tainui (New Zealand electorate), a former parliamentary Māori electorate.
- SS Tainui, a Royal Navy cargo ship that was torpedoed in 1918
