= Dagwood =

Dagwood may refer to:

- Dagwood Bumstead, a character in the comic strip Blondie
  - Dagwood sandwich, any of various extremely tall sandwiches built by the character
- Dagwood dog, a corn dog
- Dagwood (seaQuest DSV), TV character

== See also ==
- Dogwood (disambiguation)
