= Dogwood Creek =

Dogwood Creek may refer to:

- Dogwood Creek (Queensland), a stream in Queensland, Australia
- Dogwood Creek (Little Indian Creek), a stream in the US states of Arkansas and Missouri
