= Roridomyces irritans =

Scientific classification
- Kingdom: Fungi
- Division: Basidiomycota
- Class: Agaricomycetes
- Order: Agaricales
- Family: Mycenaceae
- Genus: Roridomyces
- Species: R. irritans

Binomial name
- Roridomyces irritans (E.Horak) Rexer (1994)

Synonyms
- Mycena irritans E.Horak (1978)

Species of fungus

Roridomyces irritans is a species of fungus in the genus Roridomyces, family Mycenaceae. Originally described from New Caledonia as Mycena irritans by Egon Horak in 1978, the species was transferred to Roridomyces in 1994. The fruit bodies are bioluminescent.

== See also ==
- List of bioluminescent fungus species
