= Roridomyces subglobosus =

Scientific classification
- Domain: Eukaryota
- Kingdom: Fungi
- Division: Basidiomycota
- Class: Agaricomycetes
- Order: Agaricales
- Family: Mycenaceae
- Genus: Roridomyces
- Species: R. subglobosus

Binomial name
- Roridomyces subglobosus (Berk. & M.A.Curtis) Rexer (1994)

Synonyms
- Marasmius subglobosus Berk. & M.A.Curtis (1869); Chamaeceras subglobosus (Berk. & M.A.Curtis) Kuntze (1898); Mycena subglobosa (Berk. & M.A.Curtis) Pegler (1987)

Species of fungus

Roridomyces subglobosus is a species of fungus in the genus Roridomyces, family Mycenaceae.

== Taxonomy ==
The species was first described as Marasmius subglobosus by Miles Joseph Berkeley and Moses Ashley Curtis in 1869. German mycologist Otto Kuntze transferred it to the genus Chamaeceras in 1898, and Daniel Pegler proposed the combination Mycena subglobosus in a 1987 publication.
