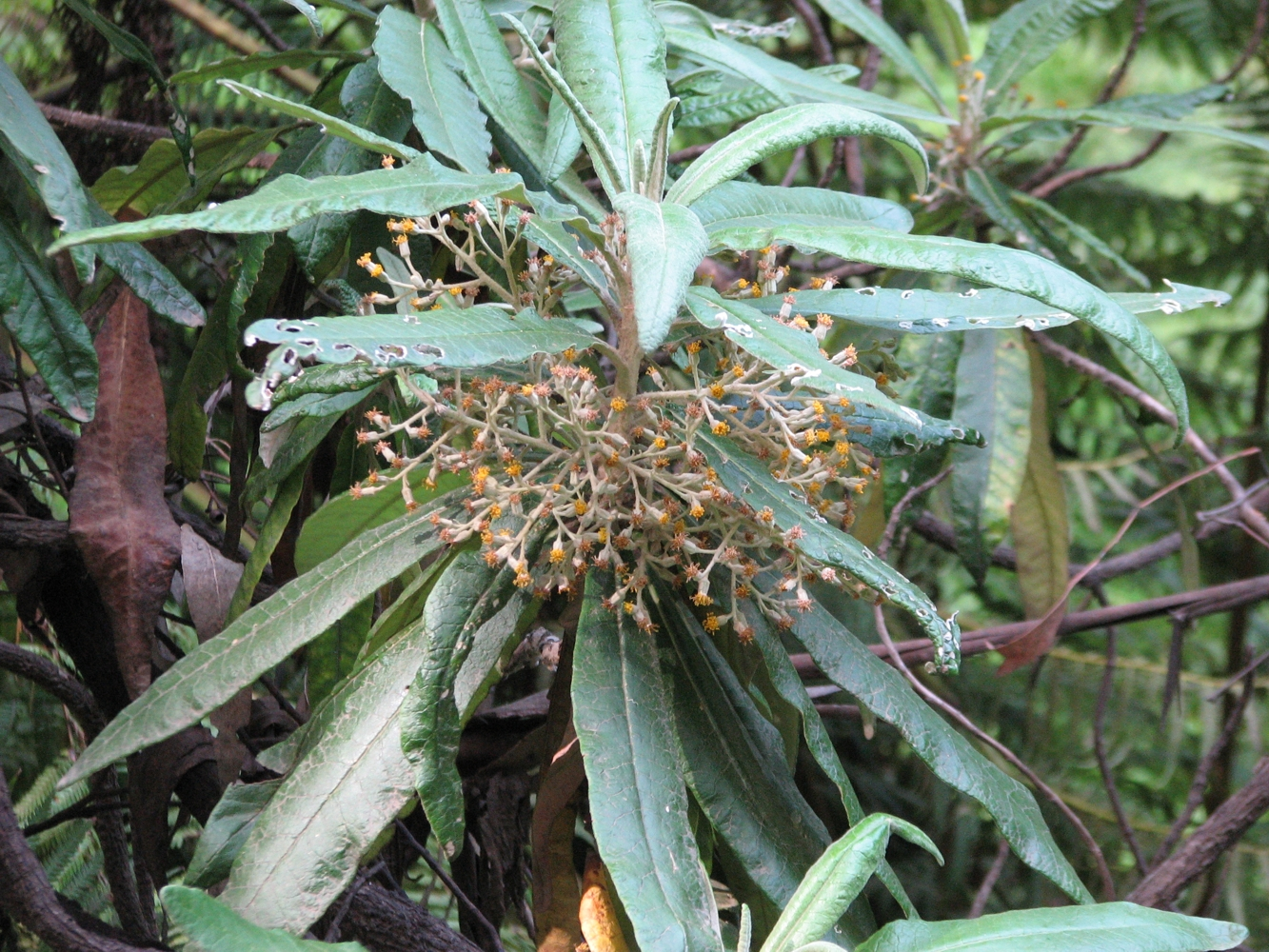
- Bedfordia arborescens

Scientific classification
- Kingdom: Plantae
- Clade: Tracheophytes
- Clade: Angiosperms
- Clade: Eudicots
- Clade: Asterids
- Order: Asterales
- Family: Asteraceae
- Subfamily: Asteroideae
- Tribe: Senecioneae
- Genus: Bedfordia; DC.

Species
- See text

= Bedfordia =

Genus of flowering plants

Bedfordia is a genus of flowering plants belonging to the family Asteraceae. The genus includes 3 species, all endemic to Australia.

== Description ==
Bedfordia are shrubs or small trees.

Stems and leaves
The young branches and lower surface of leaves and the whorl that surrounds the flower heads are densely covered with short matted and stellate hairs.

Leaves grow first on one side and then on the other in two ranks along the branches; not paired. Leaf edges are entire or with irregular rounded scallops, and have leaf stalks.
Flowers
Heads in dense axillary branched cluster which is shorter than the leaves. Flower heads have a flat circular shape; and are surrounded by a hairy bract which is at base. Tubular, bisexual florets, scarcely longer than the bract.

Fruits and reproduction
Cylindrical, grooved and not hairy achenes. Pappus bristles are finely toothed and twice as long as achenes. B. salicina intergrades with B. arborescens (a tree) and B. linearis (a shrub).

== Taxonomy ==
The genus was first formally described by Swiss botanist Augustin Pyramus de Candolle in the second volume of Archives de Botanique in 1833. The genus name honours John Russell, 6th Duke of Bedford.

Species

- Bedfordia arborescens (tree blanket leaf) - eastern Australia
  - Senecio bedfordii F.Muell
- Bedfordia linearis (slender blanket leaf) - Tasmania
  - Cacalia linearis Labill.
  - Culcitium lineare (Labill.) Spreng.
  - Senecio billardierei F.Muell.
- Bedfordia salicina DC. (blanket leaf) - Tasmania
  - Cacalia salicina Labill.
  - Culcitium salicinum (Labill.) Spreng.
