= Roridomyces praeclarus =

Scientific classification
- Kingdom: Fungi
- Division: Basidiomycota
- Class: Agaricomycetes
- Order: Agaricales
- Family: Mycenaceae
- Genus: Roridomyces
- Species: R. praeclarus

Binomial name
- Roridomyces praeclarus (E.Horak) Rexer (1994)

Synonyms
- Mycena praeclara E.Horak (1978)

Species of fungus

Roridomyces praeclarus is a species of fungus in the genus Roridomyces, family Mycenaceae.

== Taxonomy ==
The species was originally named Mycena praeclara by Egon Horak in 1978.

== Description ==
The cap is up to 8 mm (0.3 in) wide, hemispherical or convex when young becoming umbilicate or applanate with age. Its color is deep orange to reddish-orange, fading with age. The cap center is granular, dry, with indistinct grooves extending towards the margin. The gills have an arcuate to decurrent attachment to the stipe. They are white with a smooth edge that is the same color as the rest of the gill. The white, cylindrical stipe is up to 30 mm (1.2 in) and about 1 mm thick. It has pale orange coloration towards base, and is slimy when wet. Fruit bodies grow singly, not in dense groups or clusters. The mushroom has no distinctive odor or taste. The flesh of the cap is pale orange.

== Habitat and distribution ==
The fruit bodies of R. praeclarus grow on rotting leaves and twigs in rain forests of Papua New Guinea.
