= Roridomyces appendiculatus =

Scientific classification
- Domain: Eukaryota
- Kingdom: Fungi
- Division: Basidiomycota
- Class: Agaricomycetes
- Order: Agaricales
- Family: Mycenaceae
- Genus: Roridomyces
- Species: R. appendiculatus

Binomial name
- Roridomyces appendiculatus Rexer (1994)

Species of fungus

Roridomyces appendiculatus is a species of fungus in the genus Roridomyces, family Mycenaceae. It is found in Europe.
