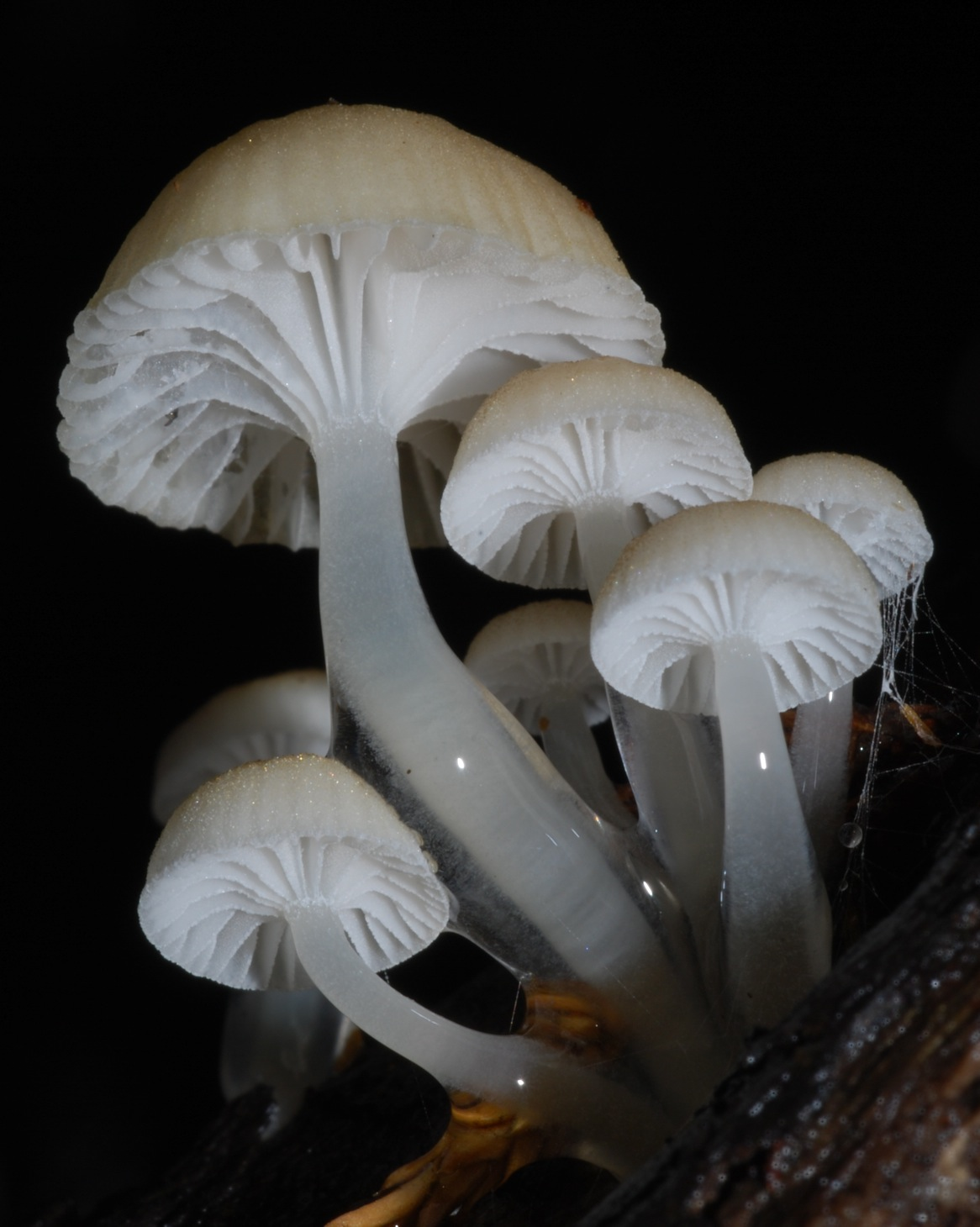
- Roridomyces austrororidus

Scientific classification
- Domain: Eukaryota
- Kingdom: Fungi
- Division: Basidiomycota
- Class: Agaricomycetes
- Order: Agaricales
- Family: Mycenaceae
- Genus: Roridomyces; Rexer (1994)

Type species
- Roridomyces roridus (Fr.) Rexer (1994)

Species
- R. appendiculatus R. austrororidus R. irritans R. lamprosporus R. mauritianus R. palmensis R. phyllostachydis R. praeclarus R. roridus R. subglobosus

= Roridomyces =

Genus of fungi

Roridomyces is a genus of fungi in the family Mycenaceae. The genus, widely distributed in temperate areas, was circumscribed by Karl-Heinz Rexer in his 1994 doctoral thesis. Species in the genus were formerly placed in Mycena section Roridae. They are characterized by having a slimy, glutinous stipe in moist conditions.

In 2020, a new bioluminescent species, R. phyllostachydis, was discovered in India. This is the first species of the genus to be found in India.
