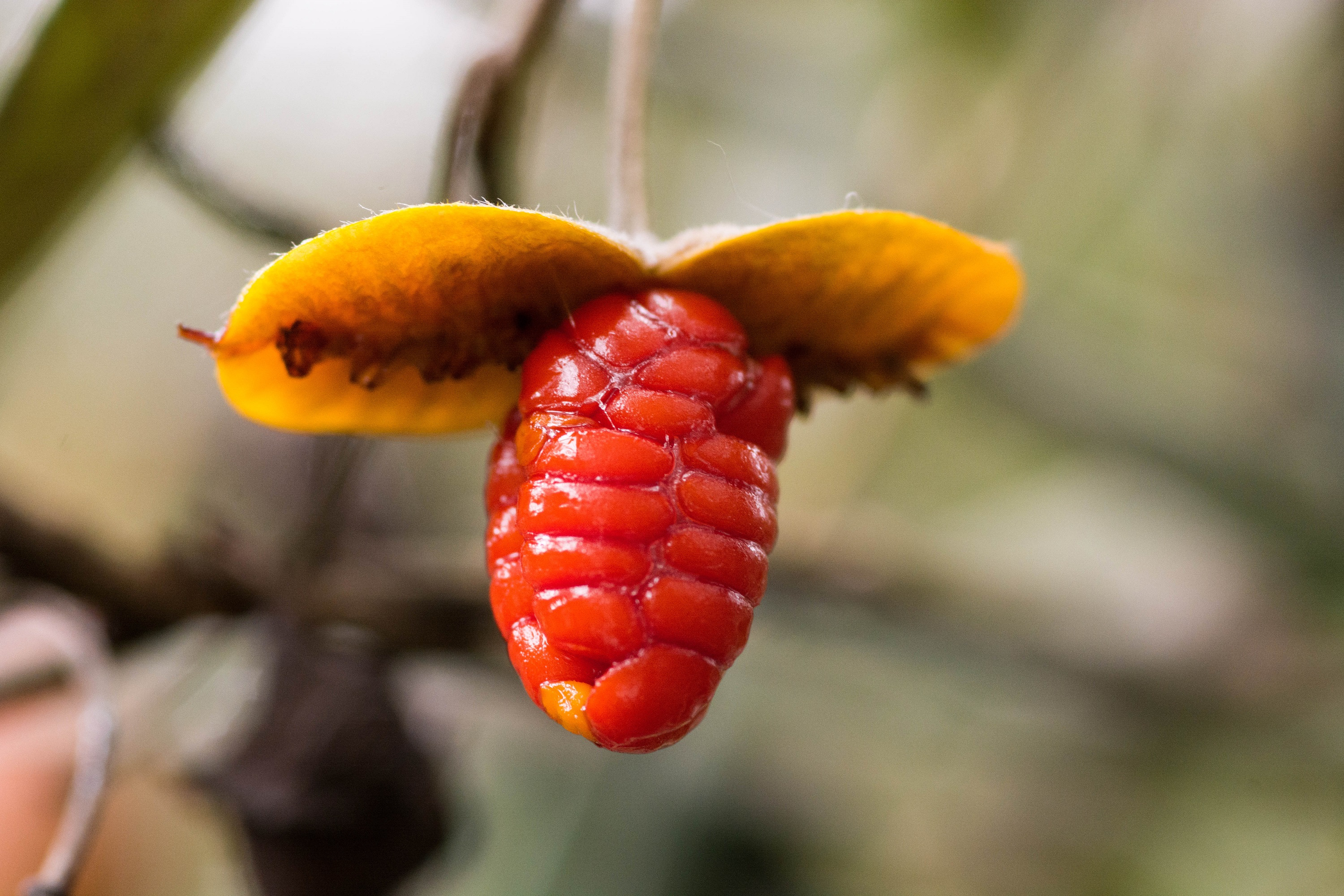
- Fruit

Scientific classification
- Kingdom: Plantae
- Clade: Tracheophytes
- Clade: Angiosperms
- Clade: Eudicots
- Clade: Asterids
- Order: Apiales
- Family: Pittosporaceae
- Genus: Pittosporum
- Species: P. bicolor

Binomial name
- Pittosporum bicolor Hook.

= Pittosporum bicolor =

Species of shrub

Pittosporum bicolor, commonly known as cheesewood or banyalla, is a flowering shrub or small tree of the family Pittosporaceae, and is native to south eastern Australia.

It is common and widespread, growing as an understorey plant in temperate wet sclerophyll forests of south eastern New South Wales, Victoria and Tasmania.

== Taxonomy ==
Pittosporum bicolor was first described by William Jackson Hooker in 1834, in his paper Contributions Towards a Flora of Van Diemen's Land, which was published in the Journal of Botany 1. Pittosporum is a genus of about 200 flowering, ever-green plants in the family Pittosporaceae.

== Description ==
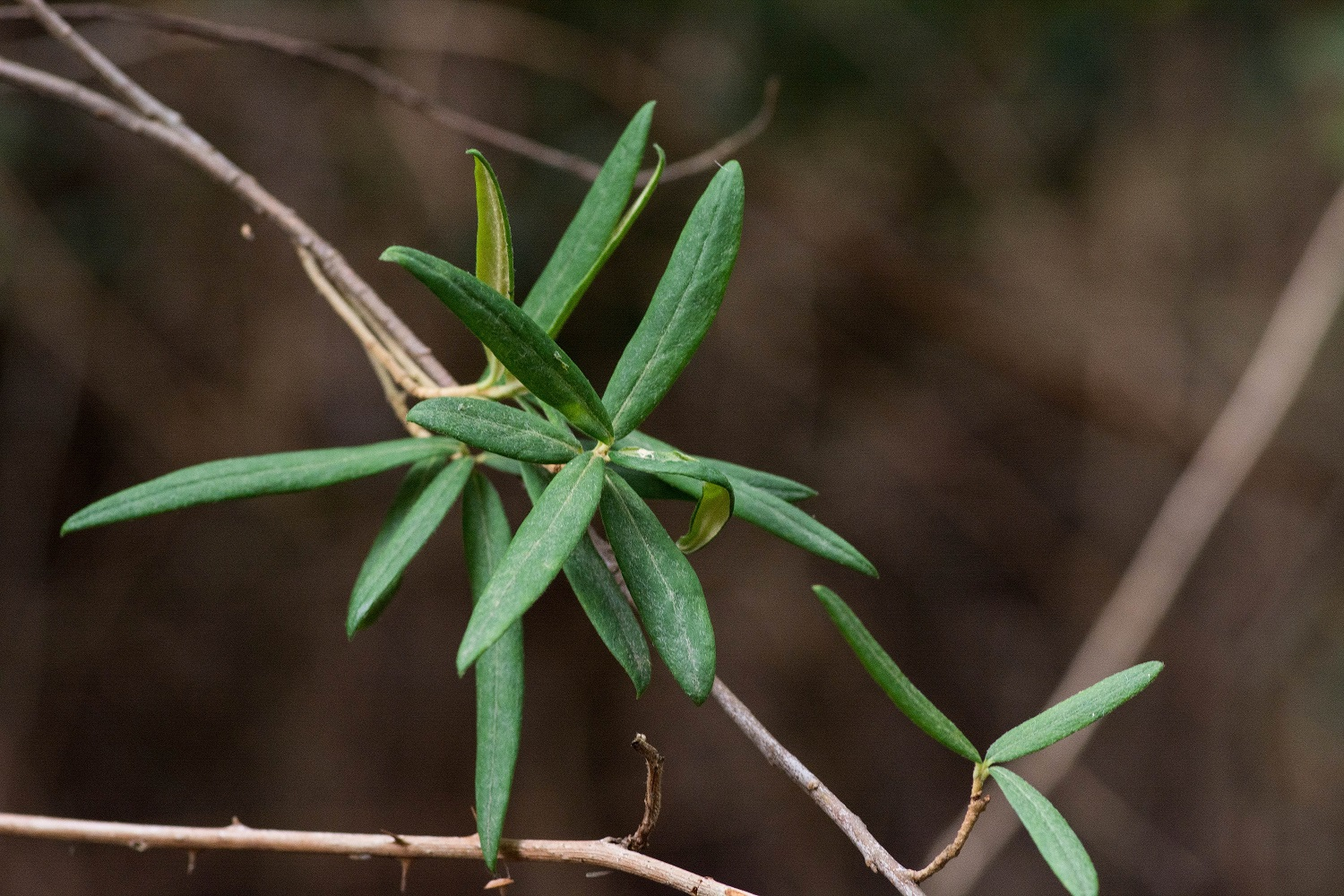
Adaxial leaf surface of P. bicolor

Leaves are narrow, and vary in shape from being lanceolate to slightly ovate. They are typically 2–8 cm long and 5-18mm wide, margins are flat or distinctly recurved, with an obtuse to subacute apex. They are alternately arranged along the stem, and, as the name suggests, are most distinct in the contrasting colours of the leaf surfaces. The adaxial surface being a glossy dark green colour, and the abaxial surface being light green to silver-grey in colour. The abaxial surface is heavily coated in fine white hairs, and occasionally the adaxial surface will also have a sparse coating of white hairs.

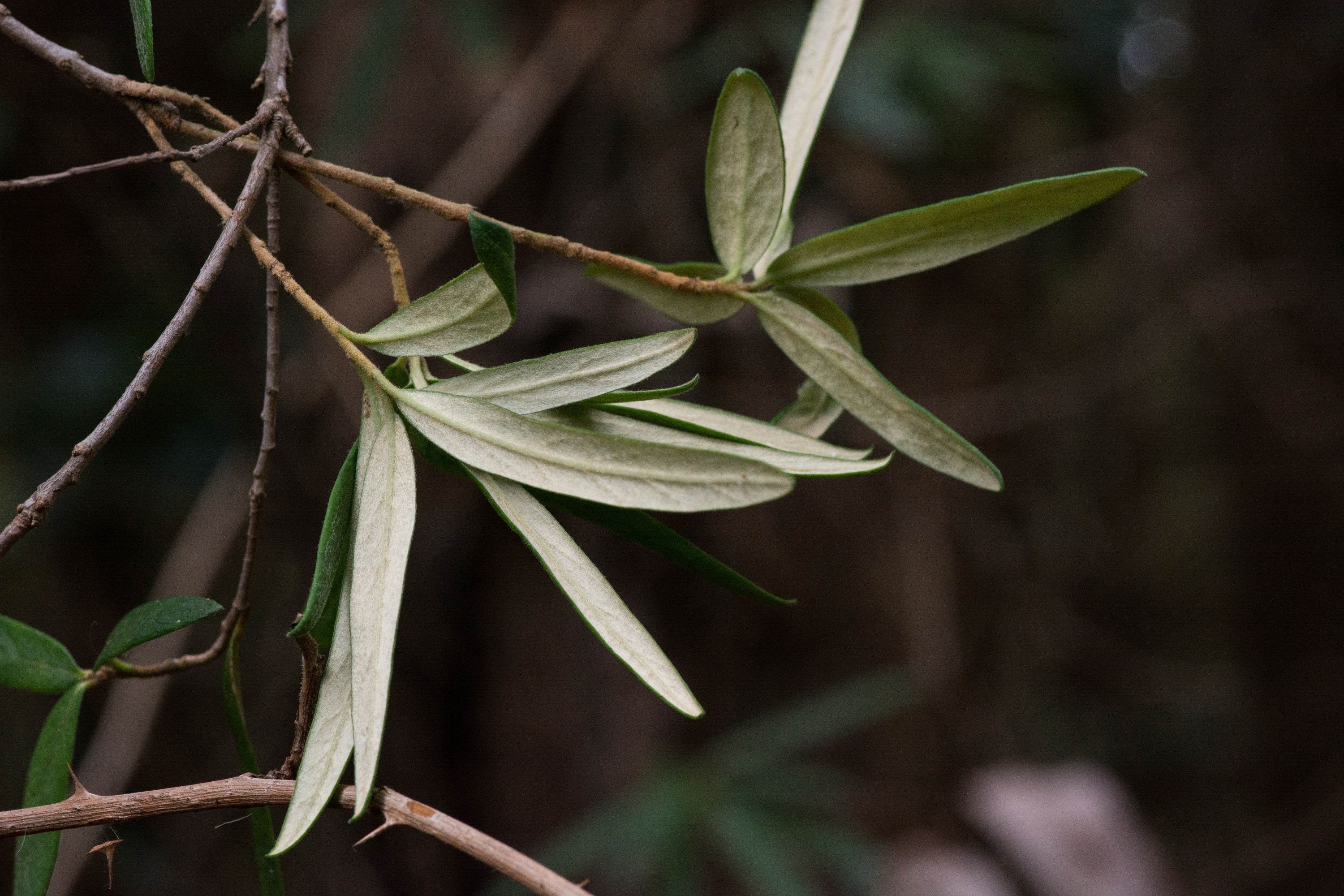
Abaxial leaf surface of P. bicolor

Flowering occurs in spring. The attractive flowers typically occur at the nodes, and may be solitary, terminal or occur in small groups. The flowers are bell shaped, and the perianth consists of 5 sepals, which are 5-6mm long and slightly curve inwards at the apex, the lower surface is coated in fine white hairs. The 5 petals are 8-11mm long and are significantly recurved. The outside colour may vary from dark burgundy red to yellow, and is typically lighter on the inside. Each flower typically houses 5 stamens and a single pistil, the ovary is superior and heavily coated in fine hairs. Each flower occurs on a long pedicel which is coated in fine hairs.

The fruit is a globose woody capsule, it is covered in fine white hairs, and varies in colour from orange to brown as it matures. The mature capsule splits in half to expose rows of 8-20 red or orange sticky seeds. Conspicuous dark valves can be seen on the inner face of the mature, open, capsule.

The bark is grey to light brown in colour, and varies from a smooth and somewhat scaly in appearance lower down, to a rougher and papery appearance higher up.

This plant grows in a conical shape, and typically achieves 2–10 metres in height, but may occasionally exceed this.

== Distribution and habitat ==
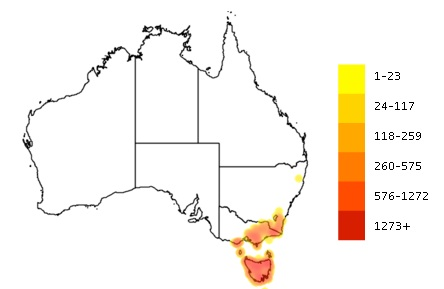
Figure 1: Distribution of P. bicolor across Australia.

Pittosporum bicolor occurs statewide across Tasmania and the Bass Strait Islands. It is loosely restricted to the south easternmost parts of New South Wales and Victoria (Figure 1).

It grows as a shrub or a small tree in gullies and the shrub understorey of wet sclerophyll forests, and is therefore tolerant of shaded conditions. It prefers to grow in moist, well drained soils, and does not typically occur at altitudes greater than 1,000 metres above sea level.

It is not uncommon for Pittosporum bicolor to occur as an epiphyte on soft tree fern species, such as Dicksonia antarctica, this is possibly an adaptation to avoid seedlings being consumed by browsing mammals.

== Related species ==
Pittosporum undulatum spp. emmetti is a hybrid species of P. bicolor and the introduced Pittosporum undulatum, the hybrid's physical appearance appears to be an intermediate between that of the two parent species.

== Cultivation ==
P. bicolor is a relatively inconspicuous plant, and is therefore not widely cultivated. However, its attractive and heavily perfumed flowers offer some appeal to gardeners.

It prefers a well draining soil, and will appreciate a sunny position, but will also thrive in a sheltered or shaded location. While it can survive in dry soils, it prefers moist or damp soils, likened to that of its natural habitat. It can tolerate heavy pruning.

Propagation is done by seed or cuttings, the ripe seeds can be collected and directly planted, they will germinate freely. Cuttings should be taken from semi hardwood, and should include a heal at the base of the cutting. Propagation by seed is likely to be more successful than propagation by cuttings, however caution should be taken when planting seeds, due to members of this genus readily hybridising.

== Gallery ==
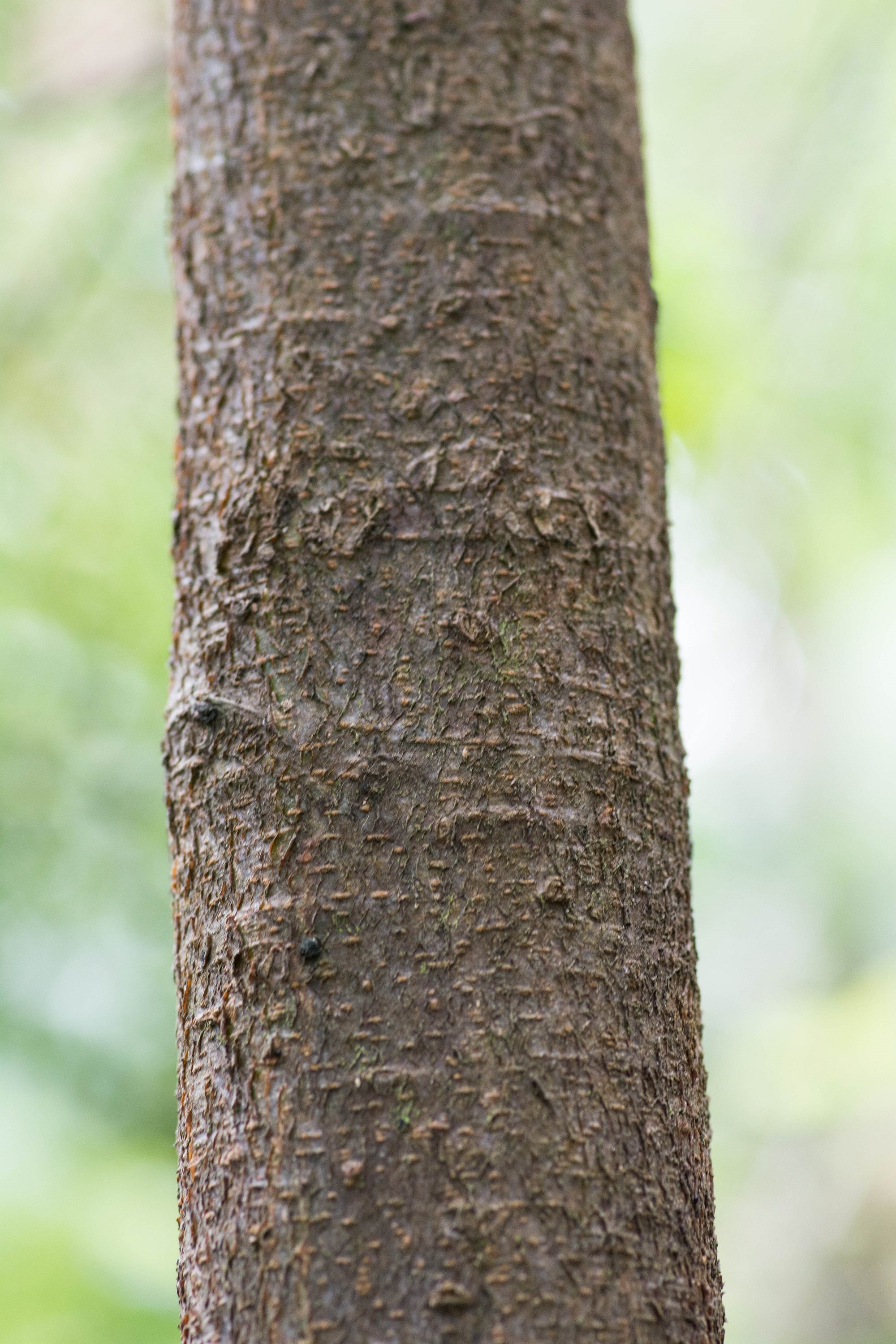
P. bicolor bark

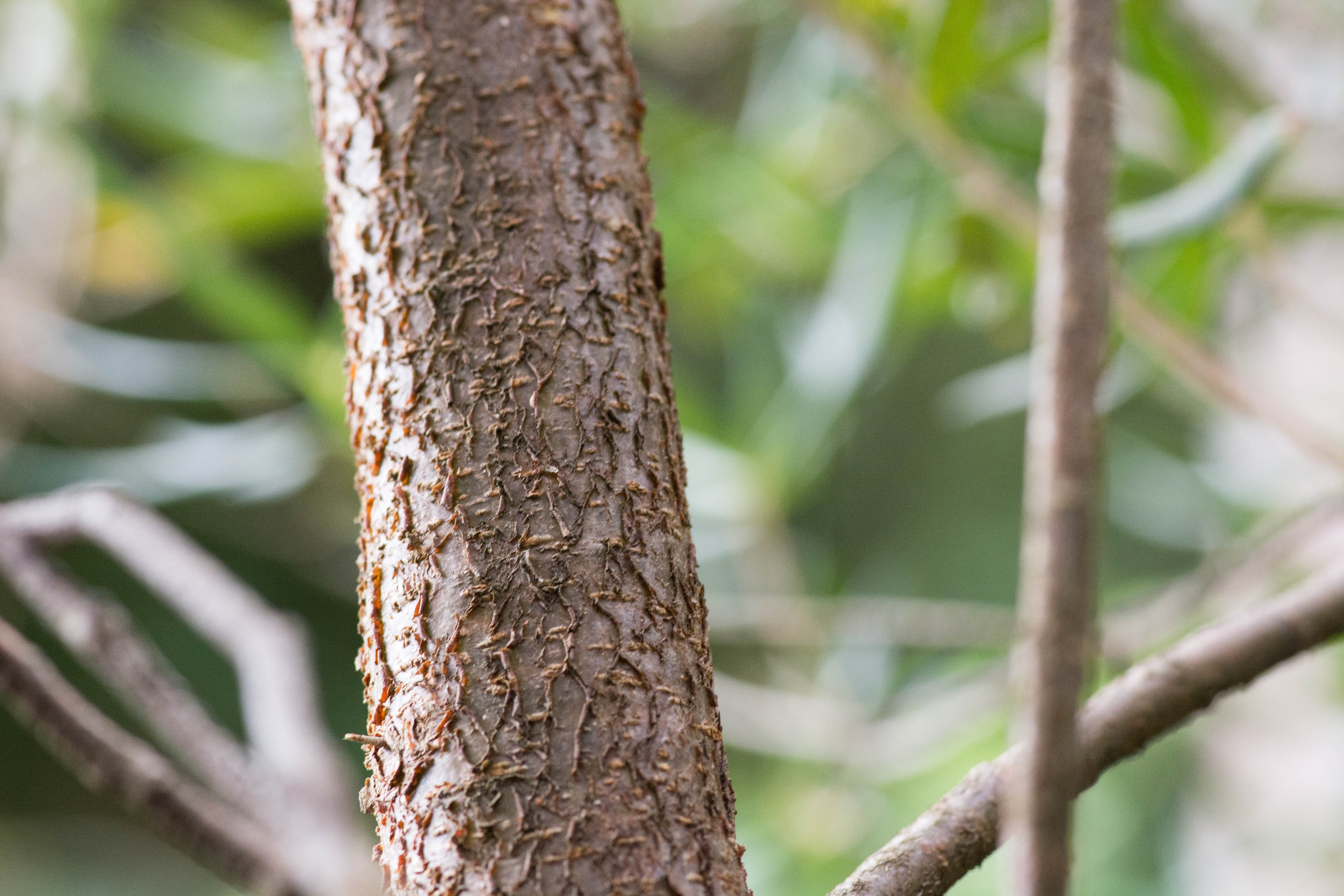
P. bicolor bark

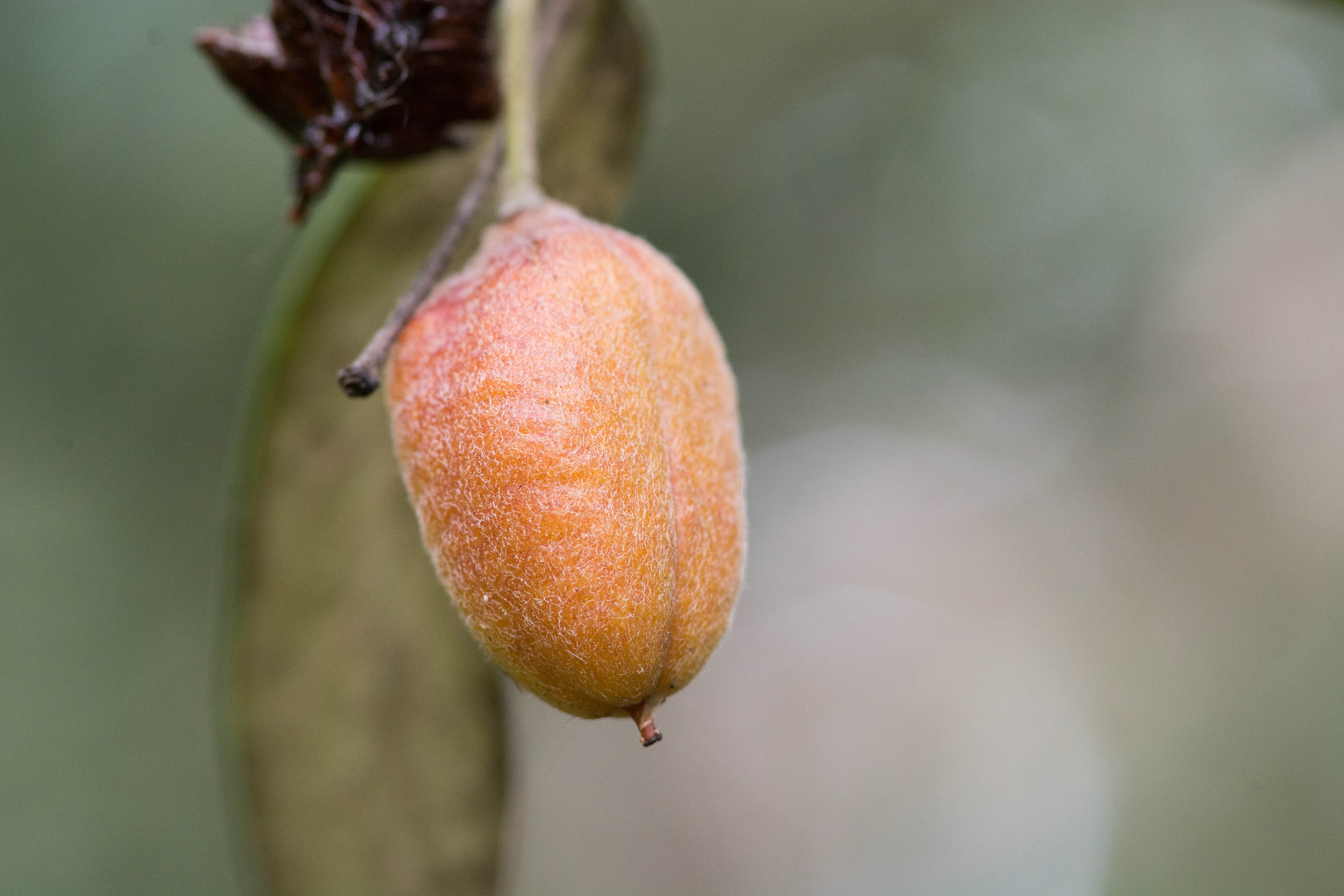
Fruit capsule

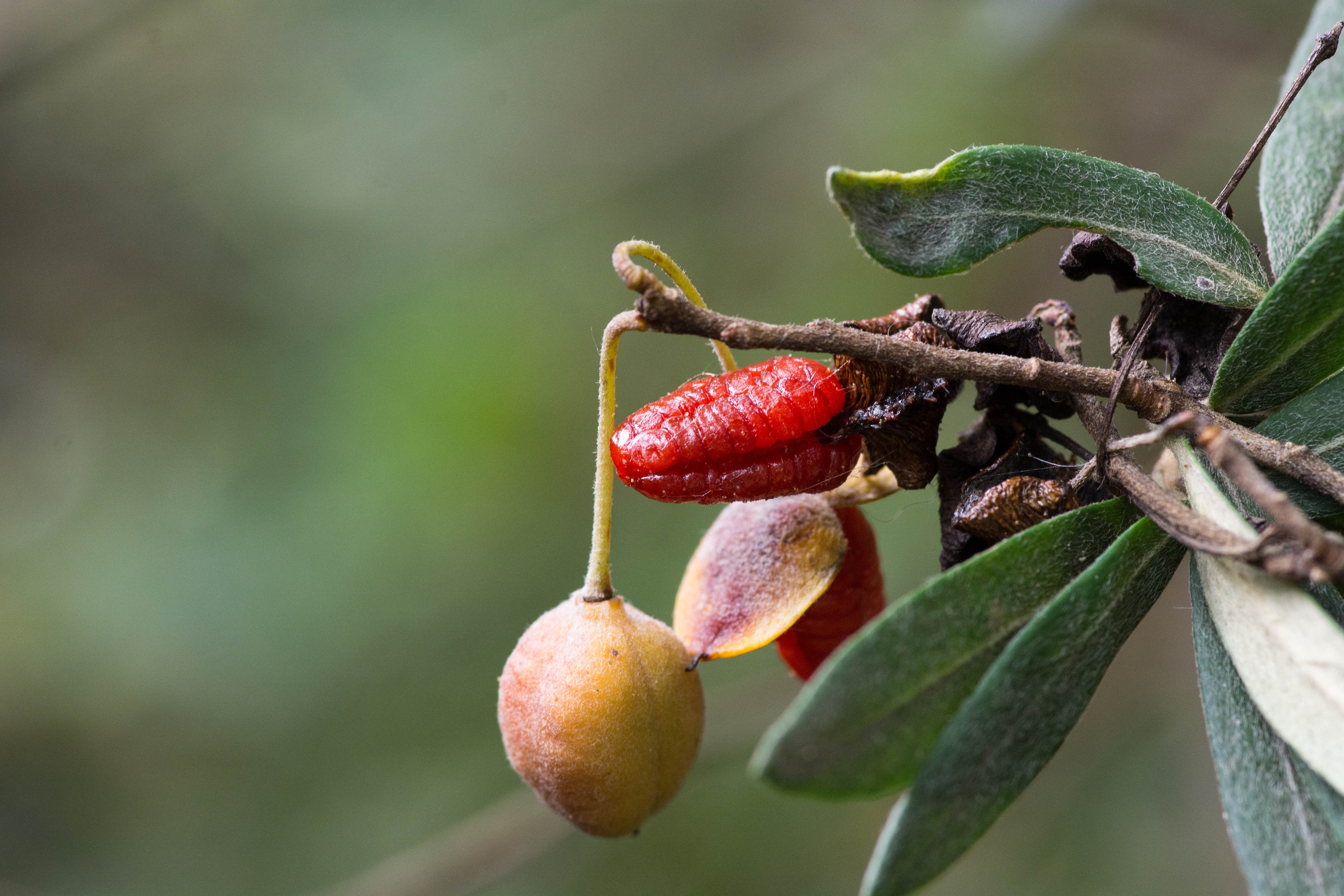
Seeds and fruit capsule

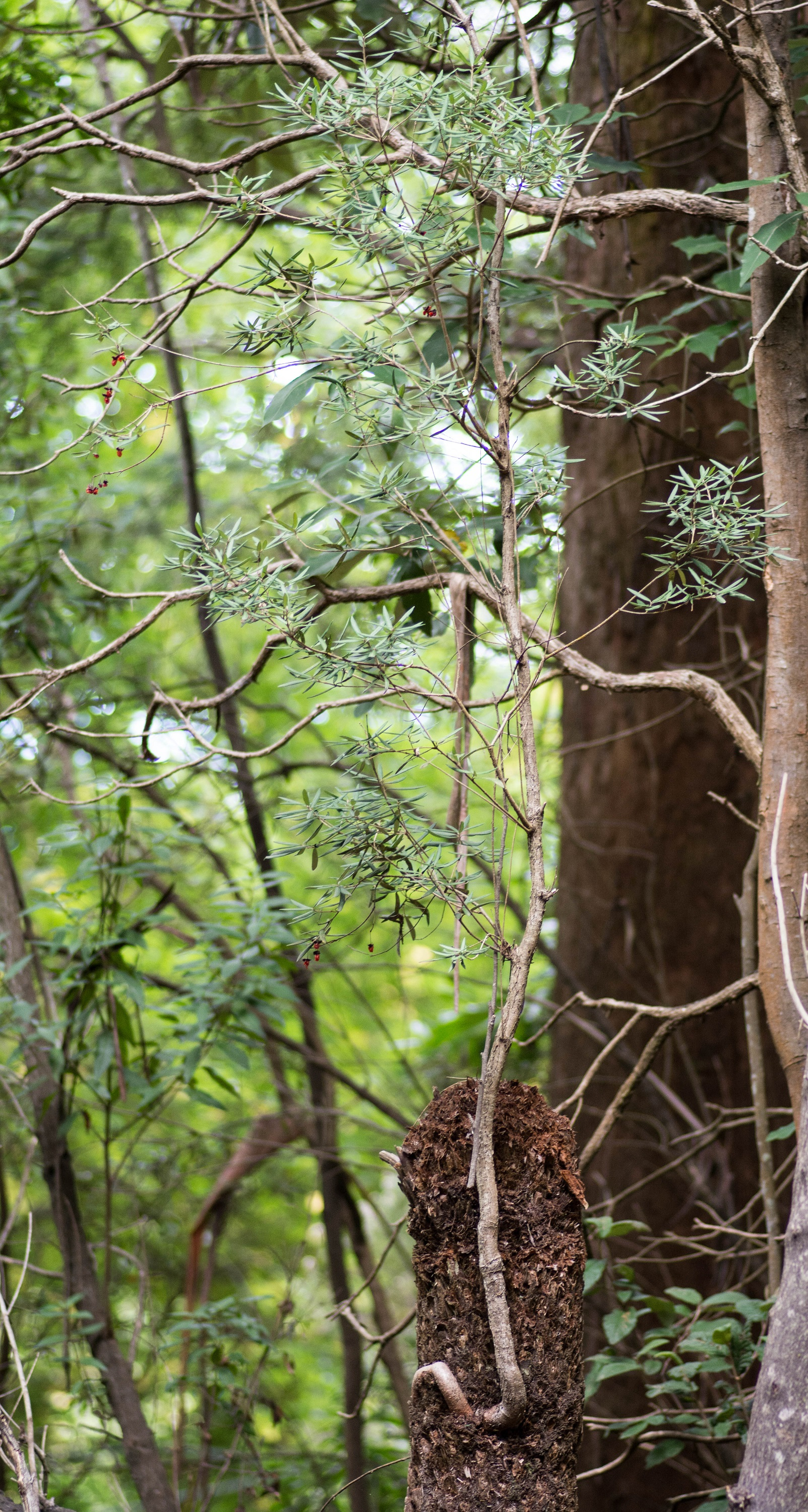
P. bicolor growing as an epiphyte on D. antarctica

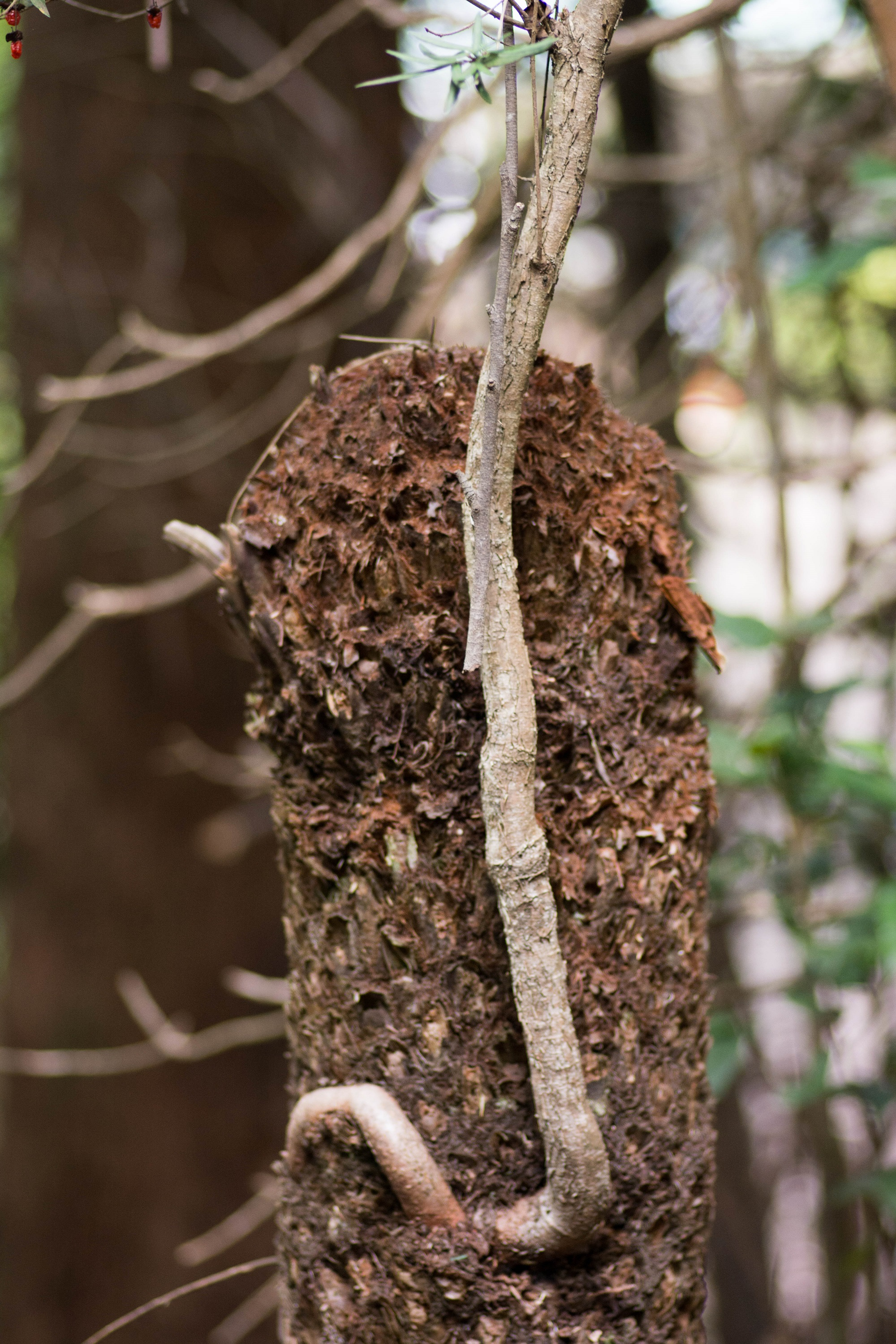
Close up of P. bicolor growing as an epiphyte on D. antarctica

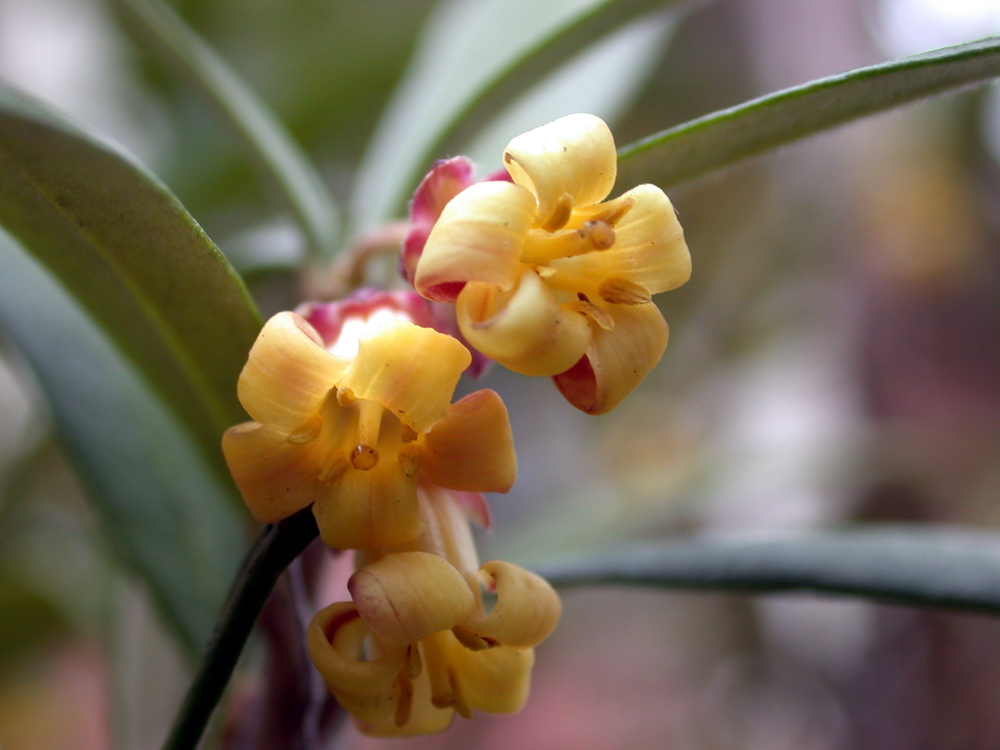
P. bicolor flowers

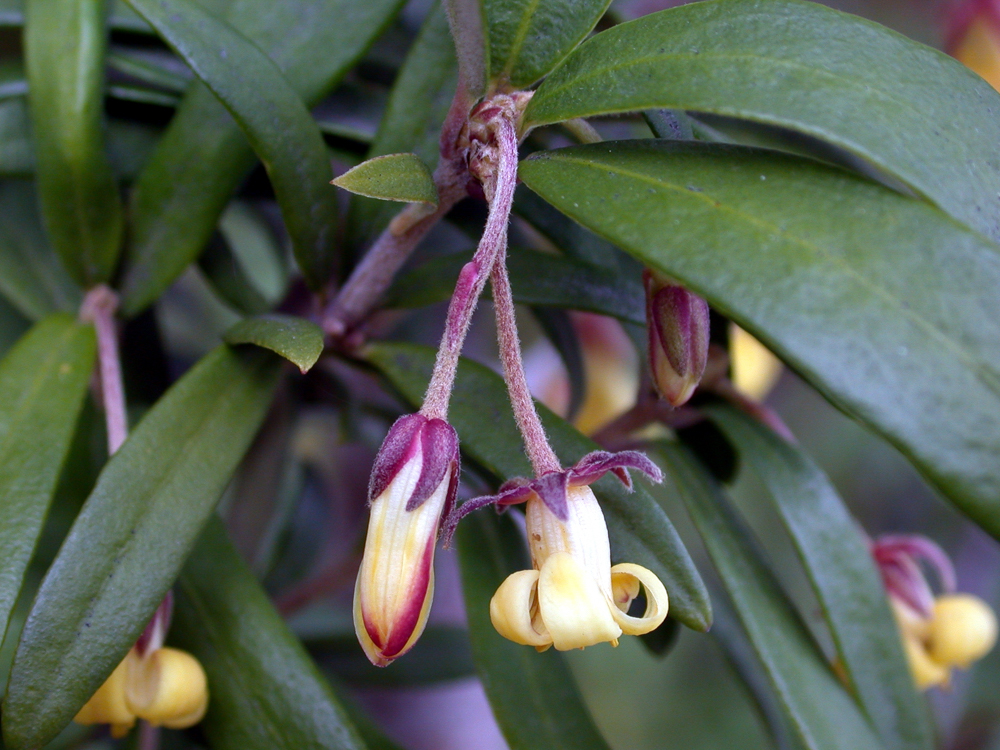
P. bicolor flowers
