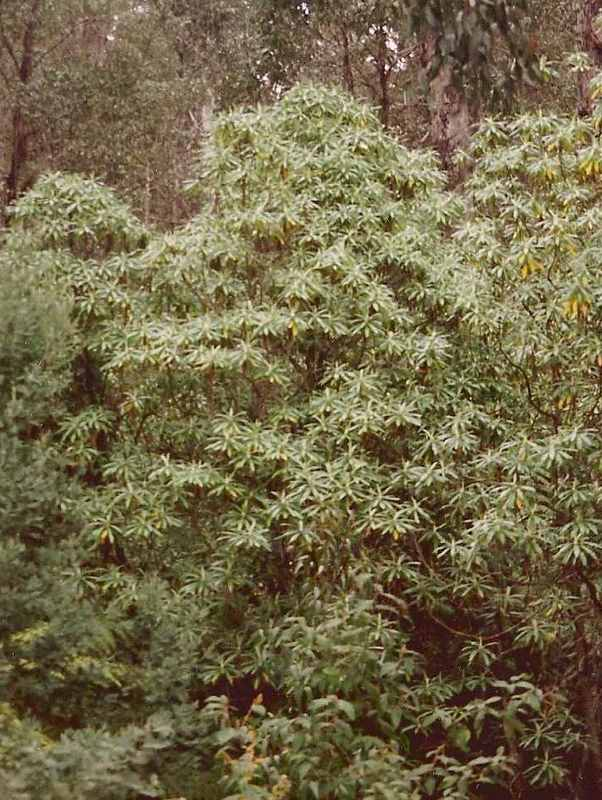
- In South East Forest National Park

Scientific classification
- Kingdom: Plantae
- Clade: Tracheophytes
- Clade: Angiosperms
- Clade: Eudicots
- Clade: Asterids
- Order: Asterales
- Family: Asteraceae
- Genus: Bedfordia
- Species: B. arborescens

Binomial name
- Bedfordia arborescens Hochr.

Synonyms
- Bedfordia salicina (Labill.) DC. misapplied.

= Bedfordia arborescens =

Species of tree

Bedfordia arborescens, known as the blanket leaf, is a shrub or small tree of southeastern Australia. It occurs in or around temperate rainforests in areas of high altitude. The natural range of distribution on the mainland is from the Otway Ranges and Wilsons Promontory (39° S) in the far southeast of the Australian continent to Monga National Park (35° S) near Braidwood, New South Wales. There is also an isolated occurrence in Tasmania on Cape Barren Island. Other common names are blanket bush, flannel leaf and tree blanketleaf.

== Description ==
Usually 3 to 6 metres in height, sometimes reaching 12 m tall and a 45 cm trunk diameter. The long leaves and their woolly white underside make it easy to identify. Blanket leaf is often crooked and asymmetrical. The trunk is not straight, irregular in cross-section but not buttressed. The main branches form close to the ground.

Small branches are covered in a whitish felt. Older branches are covered in stringy and flaky brown bark. The leaves are alternate, entire, wavy edged, white underneath, and dull green above. They are 15 to 24 cm long and 2 to 4 cm wide. The midrib is sunken on the top side, but raised on the lower side.

Yellow flowers without ray florets form on panicles in November to January. The fruit is a ribbed achene, whitish with bristles on the top, 8 mm long in the shape of a cigar. Fruiting occurs from December to January.

Whilst in no way related, the first impression of a healthy stand of blanket tree is strongly reminiscent of the rhododendrons of the Himalayas and China. This is due to similar growth habit, leaf arrangement and shape, and is consistent with a plant which grows in the middle vegetation layers, and which has the role of shading the ground.

Following the bushfires in the summer of 2006 in the Howqua Valley, Victoria, a substantial area of forest has been colonised by Bedfordia arborescens as an understory in the eucalypt dominated valleys south of Mount Timbertop.

== Taxonomy ==
The species was first formally described by Swiss botanist Bénédict Hochreutiner in the 5th volume of Candollea in 1934. His description was based on plant material collected from the Black Spur in Victoria in February 1905.
