= Roridomyces mauritianus =

Scientific classification
- Domain: Eukaryota
- Kingdom: Fungi
- Division: Basidiomycota
- Class: Agaricomycetes
- Order: Agaricales
- Family: Mycenaceae
- Genus: Roridomyces
- Species: R. mauritianus

Binomial name
- Roridomyces mauritianus (Robich & Hauskn.) Hauskn. & Krisai (2008)

Synonyms
- Mycena mauritiana Robich & Hauskn. (2001)

Species of fungus

Roridomyces mauritianus is a species of fungus in the genus Roridomyces, family Mycenaceae. It is found in Africa. The species was originally named Mycena mauritiana in 2001.
