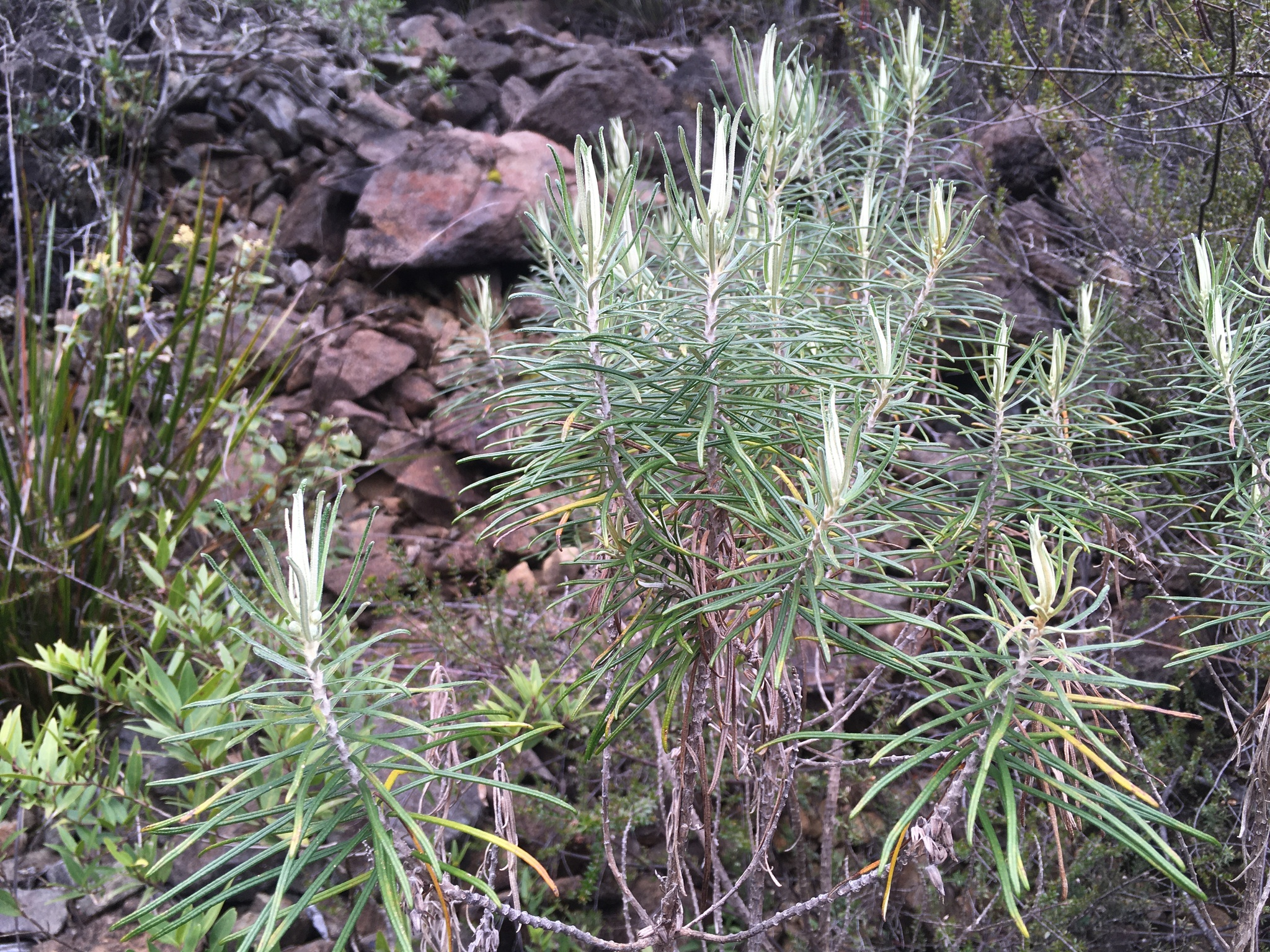

Scientific classification
- Kingdom: Plantae
- Clade: Tracheophytes
- Clade: Angiosperms
- Clade: Eudicots
- Clade: Asterids
- Order: Asterales
- Family: Asteraceae
- Genus: Bedfordia
- Species: B. linearis

Binomial name
- Bedfordia linearis (Labill.) DC.

= Bedfordia linearis =

Species of a plant

Bedfordia linearis is a species of flowering plant in the genus Bedfordia. This species is accepted. This species is common amongst dry forests and is classified as a shrub. The leaves of Bedfordia linearis vary in form and size. Some specimens have leaves that are closely revolute and about 1 cm long, while others have leaves that are flat and can grow up to 10 cm in length This species is endemic to Tasmania.
