= Dogwood Point =

Coordinates: 17.0950°N 62.6066°W

Dogwood Point is the southernmost point of Saint Kitts and Nevis, located in the southwest of the island of Nevis. A navigation light is situated on the point. The point is approximately 2.7 mi (4.3 km) SSE of Fort Charles.
