= Dogwood Creek (Little Indian Creek tributary) =

Watercourse in the United States

Dogwood Creek is a stream in the Carroll County, Arkansas and Stone County, Missouri. It is a tributary of Little Indian Creek which enters Lake Taneycomo about one mile north of the confluence.

The source is at 36°28′50″N 93°27′09″W and the confluence is at 36°31′27″N 93°27′18″W.

Dogwood Creek was so named on account of dogwood trees near its course.

== See also ==
- List of rivers of Arkansas
- List of rivers of Missouri
