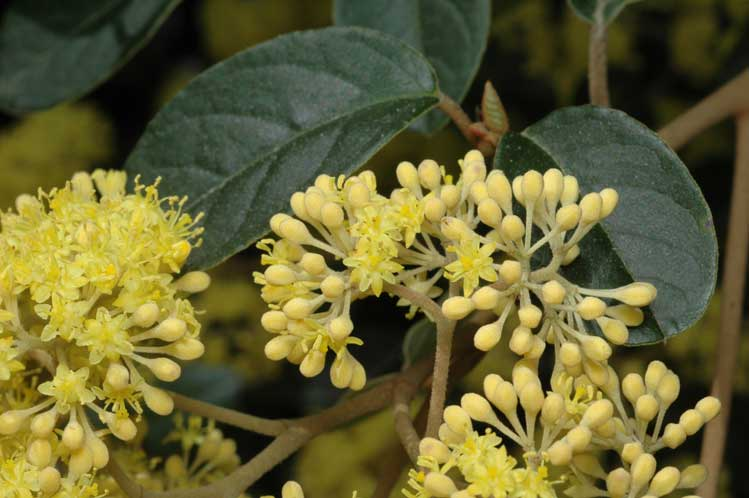

Scientific classification
- Kingdom: Plantae
- Clade: Tracheophytes
- Clade: Angiosperms
- Clade: Eudicots
- Clade: Rosids
- Order: Rosales
- Family: Rhamnaceae
- Genus: Pomaderris
- Species: P. elliptica

Binomial name
- Pomaderris elliptica Labill.

Synonyms
- Pomaderris kumeraho Fenzl nom. inval., pro syn.; Pomaderris malifolia Sieber ex Steud. nom. illeg., nom. superfl.; Pomaderris multiflora Sieber ex Fenzl; Pomatoderris elliptica Schult. orth. var.

= Pomaderris elliptica =

Species of shrub

Pomaderris elliptica, commonly known as yellow dogwood or smooth pomaderris, is a species of flowering plant in the family Rhamnaceae and is endemic to south-eastern Australia. It is a shrub with densely hairy branchlets, egg-shaped or elliptic leaves, and pale yellow flowers.

== Description ==
Pomaderris elliptica is a shrub that typically grows to a height of 1–4 m (3 ft 3 in – 13 ft 1 in), its branchlets densely covered with soft, star-shaped hairs. The leaves are egg-shaped or elliptic, 30–90 mm (1.2–3.5 in) long and 15–45 mm (0.59–1.77 in) wide with stipules 2–5 mm (0.079–0.197 in) long at the base but that fall off as the leaf develops. The upper surface of the leaves is glabrous and the lower surface densely covered with star-shaped hairs. The flowers are pale yellow and borne in clusters up to 120 mm (4.7 in) in diameter, each flower on a pedicel 2–5 mm (0.079–0.197 in) long. The floral cup is 0.8–1 mm (0.031–0.039 in) long, the sepals 1.5–2.0 mm (0.059–0.079 in) long but fall off as the flower opens, and the petals are 1.5–2.0 mm (0.059–0.079 in) long. Flowering occurs from September to December.

== Taxonomy ==
Pomaderris elliptica was first formally described in 1805 by Jacques Labillardière in his Novae Hollandiae Plantarum Specimen. The specific epithet (elliptica) means "elliptic".

The names of two varieties are accepted by the Australian Plant Census:

- Pomaderris elliptica var. diemenica N.G.Walsh & Coates;
- Pomaderris elliptica Labill. var. elliptica.

== Distribution and habitat ==
This pomaderris grows in open forest and is widespread from south of Taree in New South Wales through south-eastern Victoria to Tasmania. Variety diemenica is endemic to Tasmania.
