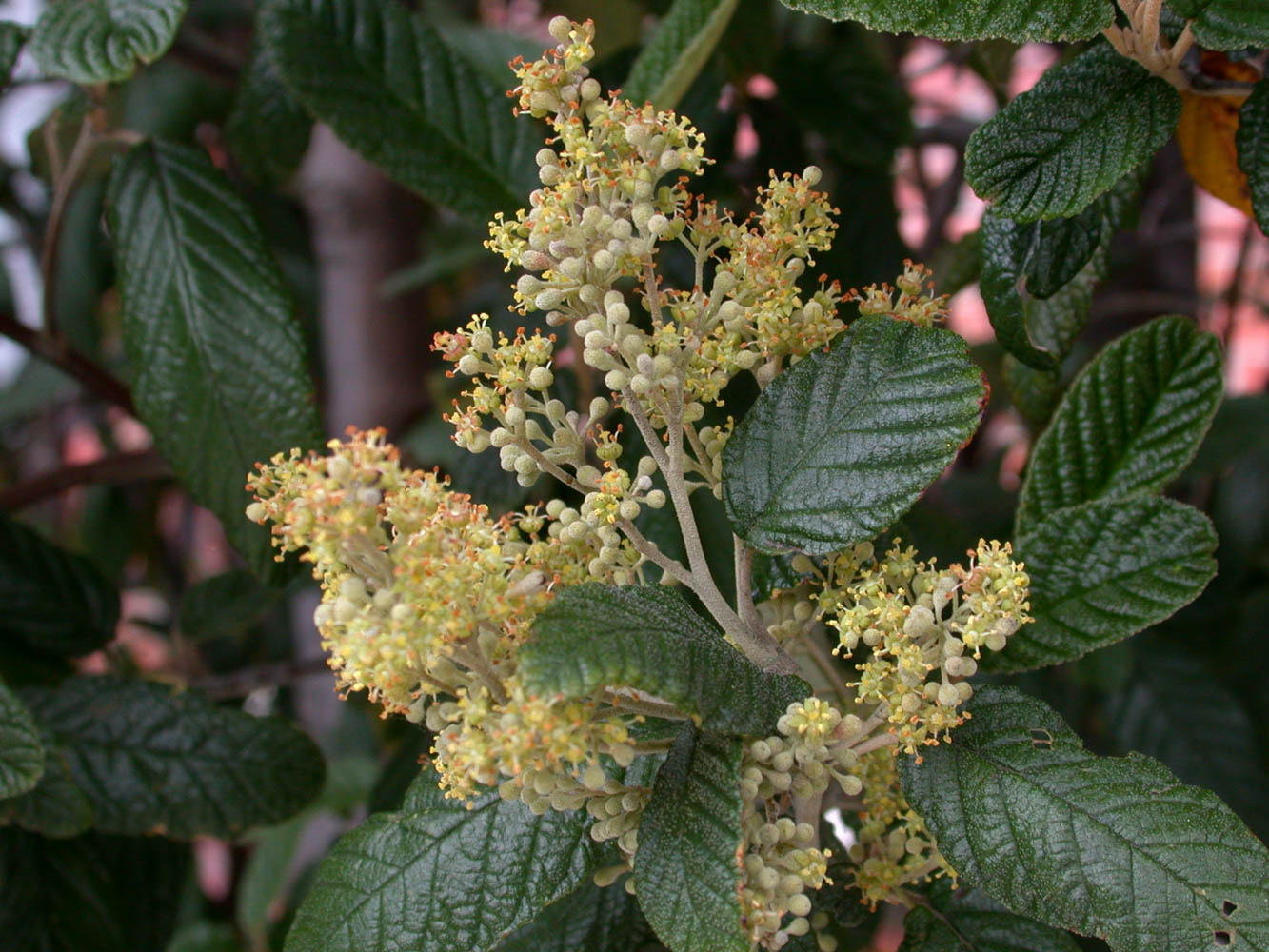
- Pomaderris apetala with springtime flowers, photo courtesy of Rob Wiltshire

Scientific classification
- Kingdom: Plantae
- Clade: Tracheophytes
- Clade: Angiosperms
- Clade: Eudicots
- Clade: Rosids
- Order: Rosales
- Family: Rhamnaceae
- Genus: Pomaderris
- Species: P. apetala

Binomial name
- Pomaderris apetala Labill.

= Pomaderris apetala =

Species of tree

Pomaderris apetala is a small tree or large shrub from the family Rhamnaceae, growing in Victoria, New Zealand and Tasmania.

In New Zealand, P. apetala is commonly known as the New Zealand Hazel. Māori names include tainui, nonokia, and nonorangi. The name ‘Tainui’, is traditionally derived from the P. apetala plants that sprang from the skids of the ‘Tainui’ canoe used by Māori who first colonised New Zealand.

== Taxonomy ==
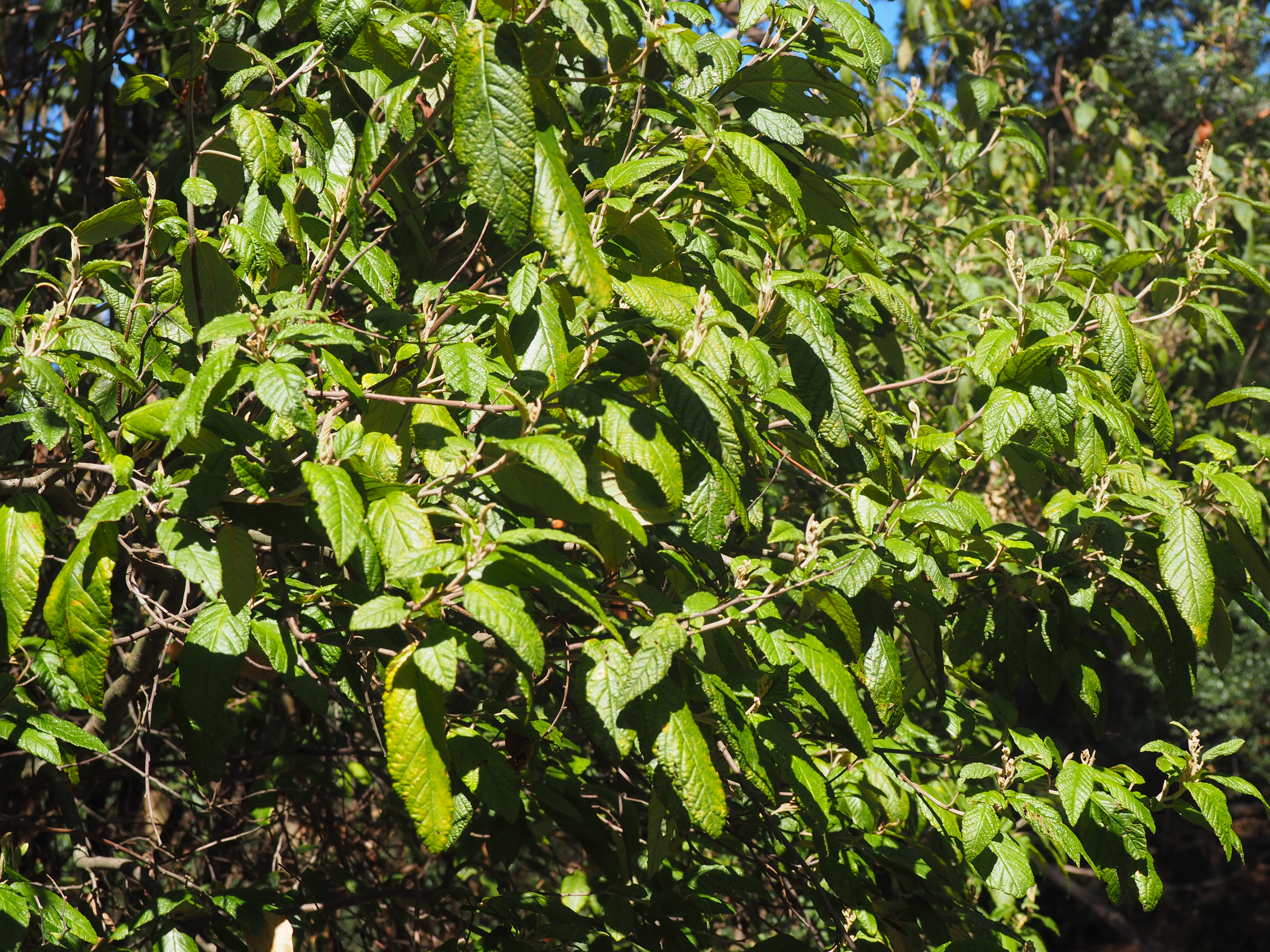
Pomaderris apetala located on the University of Tasmania Reserve, Sandy Bay, Tasmania.

Pomaderris is derived from the Greek words poma and derris meaning “a lid” and “skin” respectively, referring to the membranous skin covering the capsules. The a of apetala means “without”, and petala is derived from the Latin phrase petalum which is currently used in botanical nomenclature for “petals”. Therefore apetala means ‘without petals’. Pomaderris apetala was first described in the publication Novae Hollandiae Plantarum Specimen by Jacques - Julien Houtou de Labillardière in 1805. Pomaderris apetala Labill. subsp. maritima was first described by N. G. Walsh and F. Coates in the publication New Taxa, New Combinations and an Infrageneric Classification in Pomaderris (Rhamnaceae) in 1997. The specimen used for this description was collected from the Asbestos Range National Park (now known as Narawntapu National Park), 1.7 km due south from the northern tip of Badger Head. P. apetala can be confused with P. aspera, which has previously been used as a taxonomic synonym.

== Taxa and Descriptions ==
=== Pomaderris apetala Labill. ===
Nov. Holl. Pl. 1: 62, t.87 (1805)

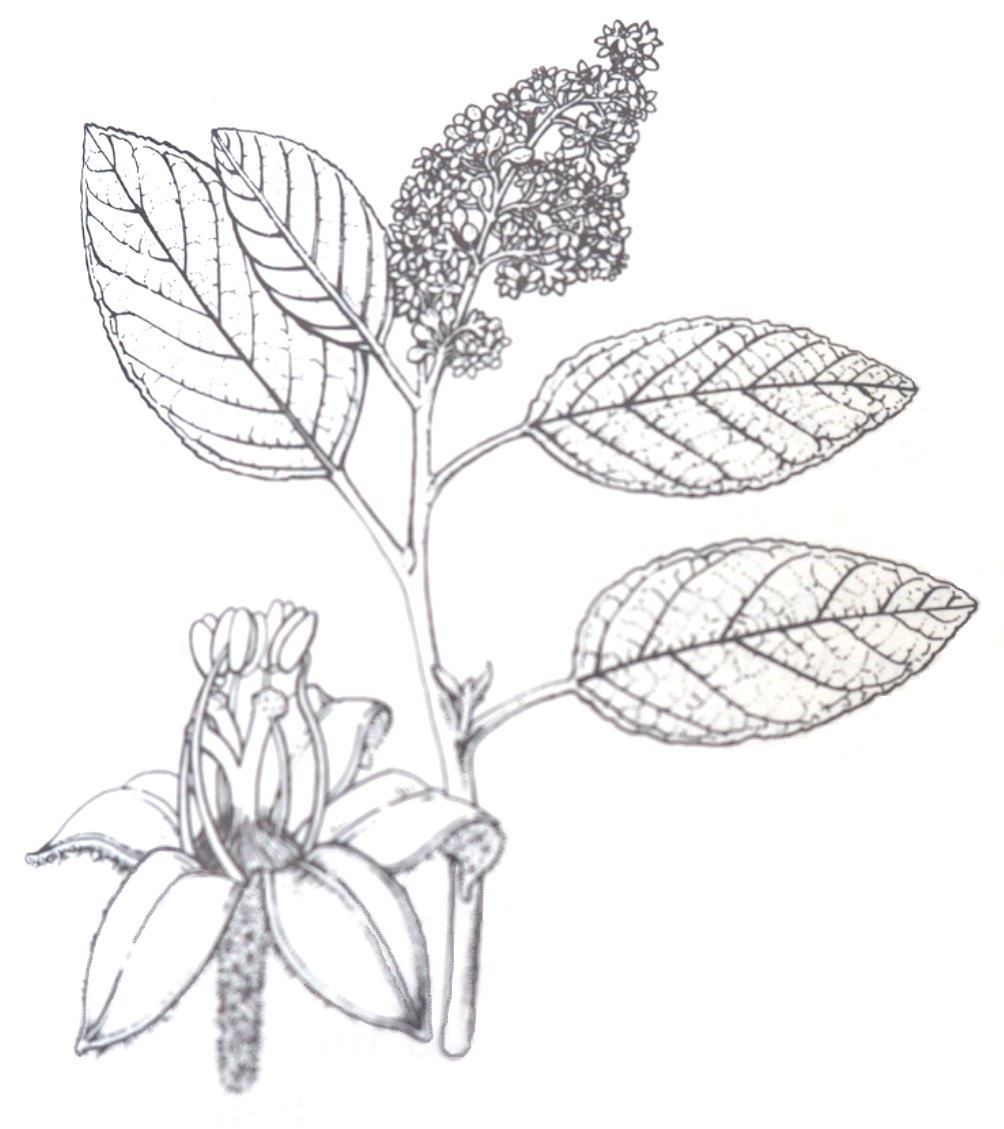
Pomaderris apetala subsp. maritima displaying flower arrangement and leaf shape. Picture adapted from Walsh, N.J. & Entwisle, T.J. (1999) Dicotyledons: Cornaceae to Asteraceae in 'Flora of Victoria', Inkata Press, Melbourne

This plant can grow 1- 15m tall in southern Australia, but in New Zealand plants only grow up to 4m tall. Branchlets are greyish and covered in velvety brown, stellate-pubescent hairs. The trees have characteristic straight, smooth barked stems. Leaves are narrow-ovate to elliptic in shape, and have slightly serrated margins. Leaves are also stalked and alternately arranged. On the adaxial surface, leaves are dark green with deeply impressed veins. On the abaxial surface, leaves are a pale greyish colour and have prominent veins covered with fine, greyish-brown, dense, sessile star-shaped hairs. Inflorescence consists of large panicles with pale yellow, cream, or greenish coloured flowers. Flowers are also small, exist in terminal clusters, have no petals, and have ovaries which are practically inferior. The sepals are persistent, bracts deciduous, and the operculum is membranous. Pedicels are 1-5mm long, inflorescences 5–25 cm long, 2–13 cm wide, hypanthium 1-1.5mm long, and sepals 1.5-2.1mm long. Fruits are 3-celled capsules. These capsules open via 3 valves. Flowering occurs from October to November, and fruits appear from December to January.

=== Pomaderris apetala subsp. maritima N.G.Walsh & Coates ===
Muelleria 10: 34 (1997) - coast dogwood or coast rough dogwood (Tasmania), Tasman Pomaderris (Victoria)

Typically exists as a shrub 1-3m tall. Leaves up to twice as long as wide, about 25-60mm long, and 15-30mm wide. The leaf apex is obtuse. Sparse stellate hairs persist on the adaxial surface.

=== Pomaderris apetala subsp. apetala ===
common dogwood (Tasmania), Grampians Pomaderris (Victoria)

Typically exists as a shrub or tree 2-15m tall. Leaves generally more than twice as long as wide, about 40-110mm long, and 20-30mm wide. The leaf apex is normally acute. The adaxial surface is glabrescent, and is occasionally stellate-pubescent, smooth or wrinkled.

== Habitat and distribution ==
Both subspecies of P. apetala are located within Tasmania and Victoria, however only P. apetala subsp. maritima is located in New Zealand. In Victoria, P. apetala subsp. apetala is located in the Greater Grampians and Highlands-Southern Fall bioregions, whereas P. apetala subsp. maritima is located within the Gippsland Plain and Wilsons Promontory bioregions. In New Zealand, P. apetala is mostly restricted to the northern island and the northern section of the mainland. P. apetala subsp. apetala is widespread across Tasmania, whereas P. apetala subsp. maritima is mostly restricted to Flinders Island, and the northern and eastern coasts of Tasmania. P. apetala can be found on the margins of fern gullies and stream edges. P. apetala is also a common riparian species in south eastern Tasmania. P. apetala subsp. maritima has been recorded on low dunes and sea cliffs. In Tasmania, P. apetala is usually one of the main components of the Tasmanian wet sclerophyll forest understorey. However, P. apetala is known to occur more commonly in wet sclerophyll forests on fertile sites. P. apetala can also form canopies in dry rainforests. These forests tend to reside within fire protected gullies and scree slopes of dryer sites. P. apetala has also been recorded within mixed forest and rainforest sites that have been disturbed by logging or fire.

== Uses ==
Pomaderris apetala can be useful for streamside stabilisation due to its good soil binding qualities. The wood of P. apetala can be useful for carving, fine turner’s work, and drawing instruments. P. apetala is also known to have a low flammability, so it can serve as a valuable replacement for highly flammable plants. The low flammability of P. apetala means it can be grown in Building Protection Zones. Building Protection Zones, also known as Asset Production Zones, are zones surrounding households in bushfire prone areas that contain minimal fuel loads.

== Cultivation ==
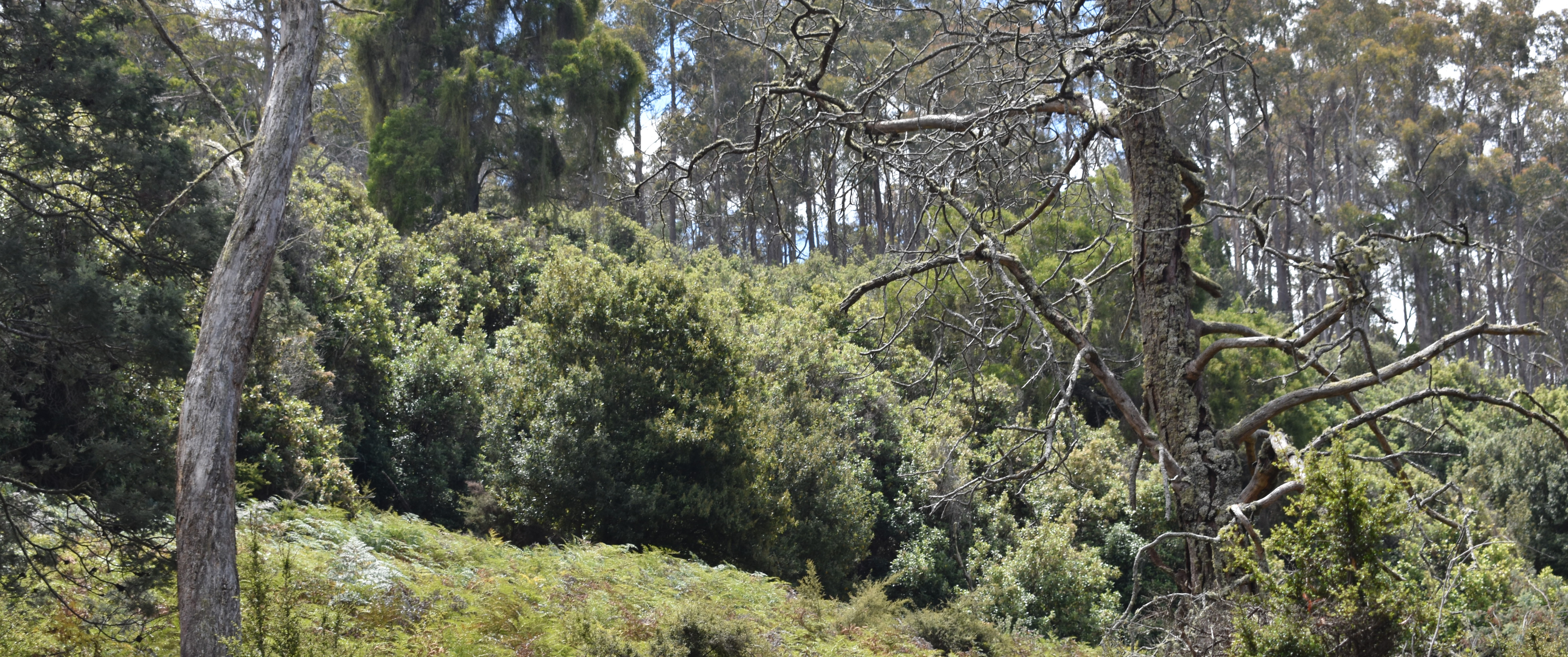
Photo of a typical dry rainforest stand. Pomaderris apetala is known to form canopies in dry rainforests like this one. Picture taken on a property in Deddington, Tasmania.

P. apetala can be propagated from fresh seeds or cuttings of firm young growth. This species is frost hardy, and should be grown in moist, acidic soils that are well drained and have a shady aspect.

== Conservation ==
There are currently less than 250 mature individuals of P. apetala subsp. maritima in New Zealand. Therefore, the subspecies is considered to be ‘Nationally Critical’ according to the criteria defined by Townsend and colleagues in 2008. Within Victoria, P. apetala subsp. apetala and P. apetala subsp. maritima are considered rare and vulnerable respectively. For this assessment, ‘rare’ is used for taxa that are not considered to be threatened, but have populations that are small in size or confined to a small area. ‘Vulnerable’ is used for taxa that are not presently in danger, but may soon decline because their populations are located in areas threatened by land use change. P. apetala is also located within three of Tasmania's threatened plant communities currently listed under Tasmania’s Nature Conservation Act 2002. These are Eucalyptus viminalis Wet Forest, Riparian Scrub, and Notelaea-Pomaderris-Beyeria Forest (also known as dry rainforest).

== Gallery ==
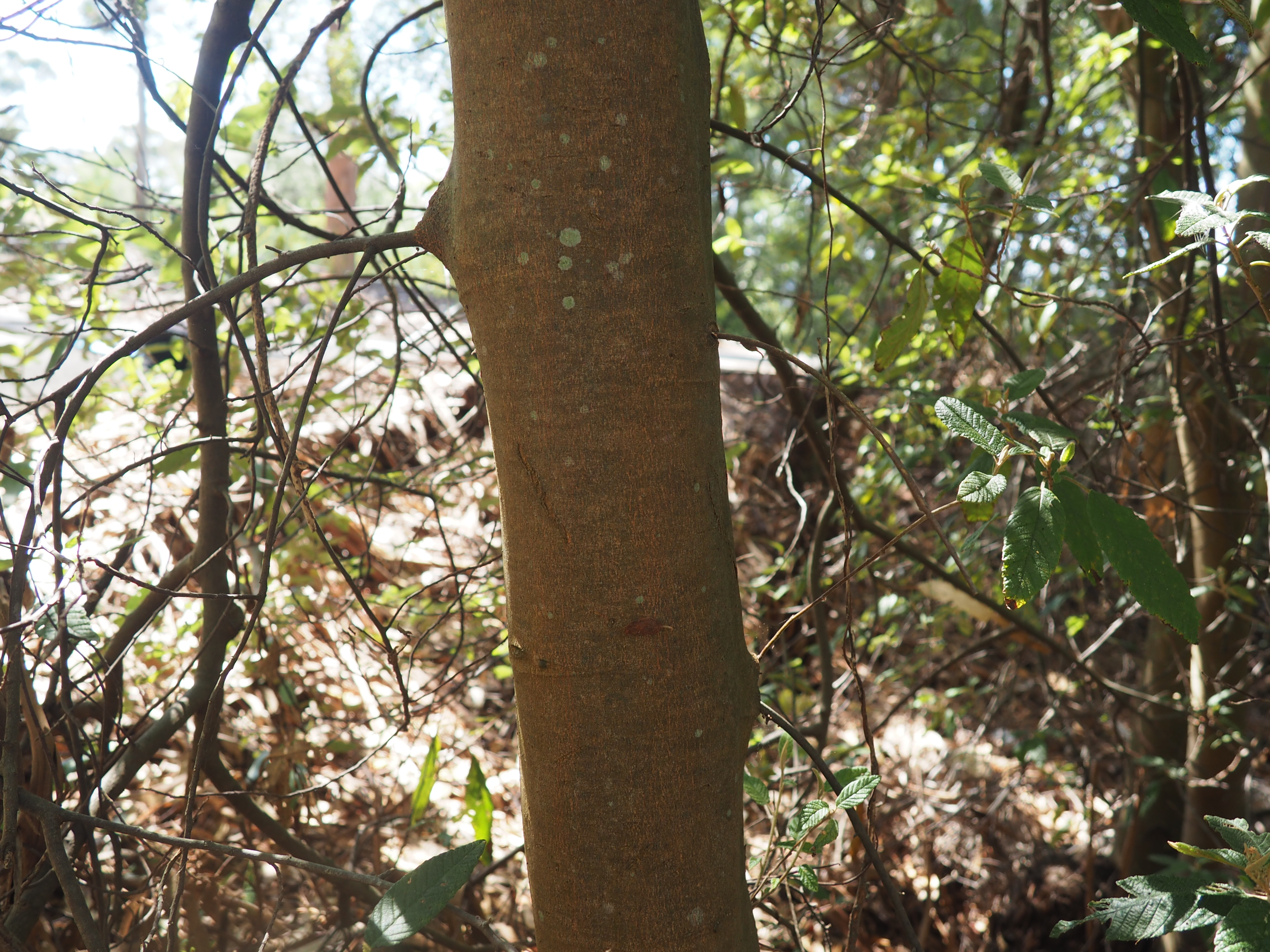
Smooth bark of Pomaderris apetala

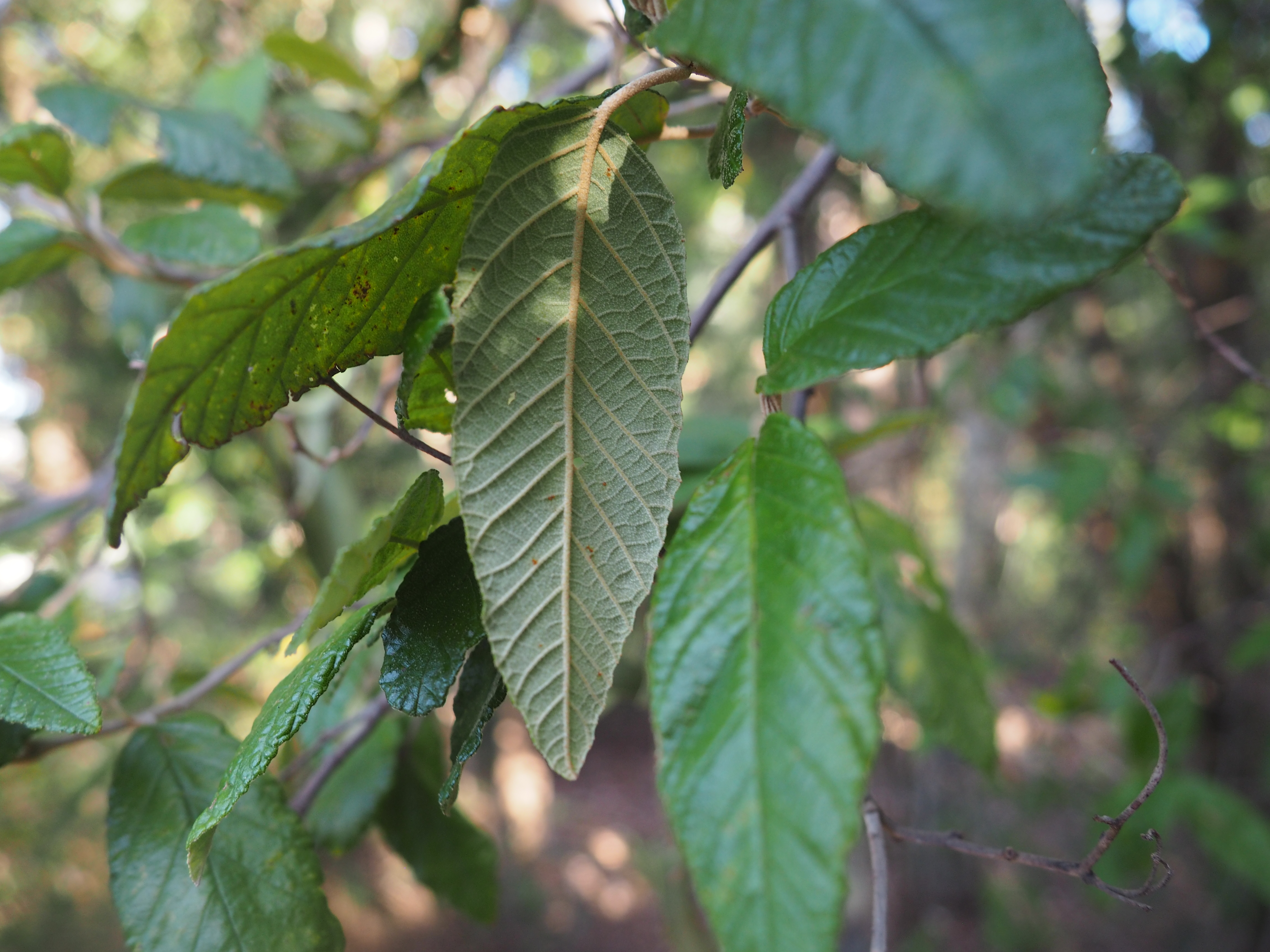
Abaxial surface of a Pomaderris apetala leaf

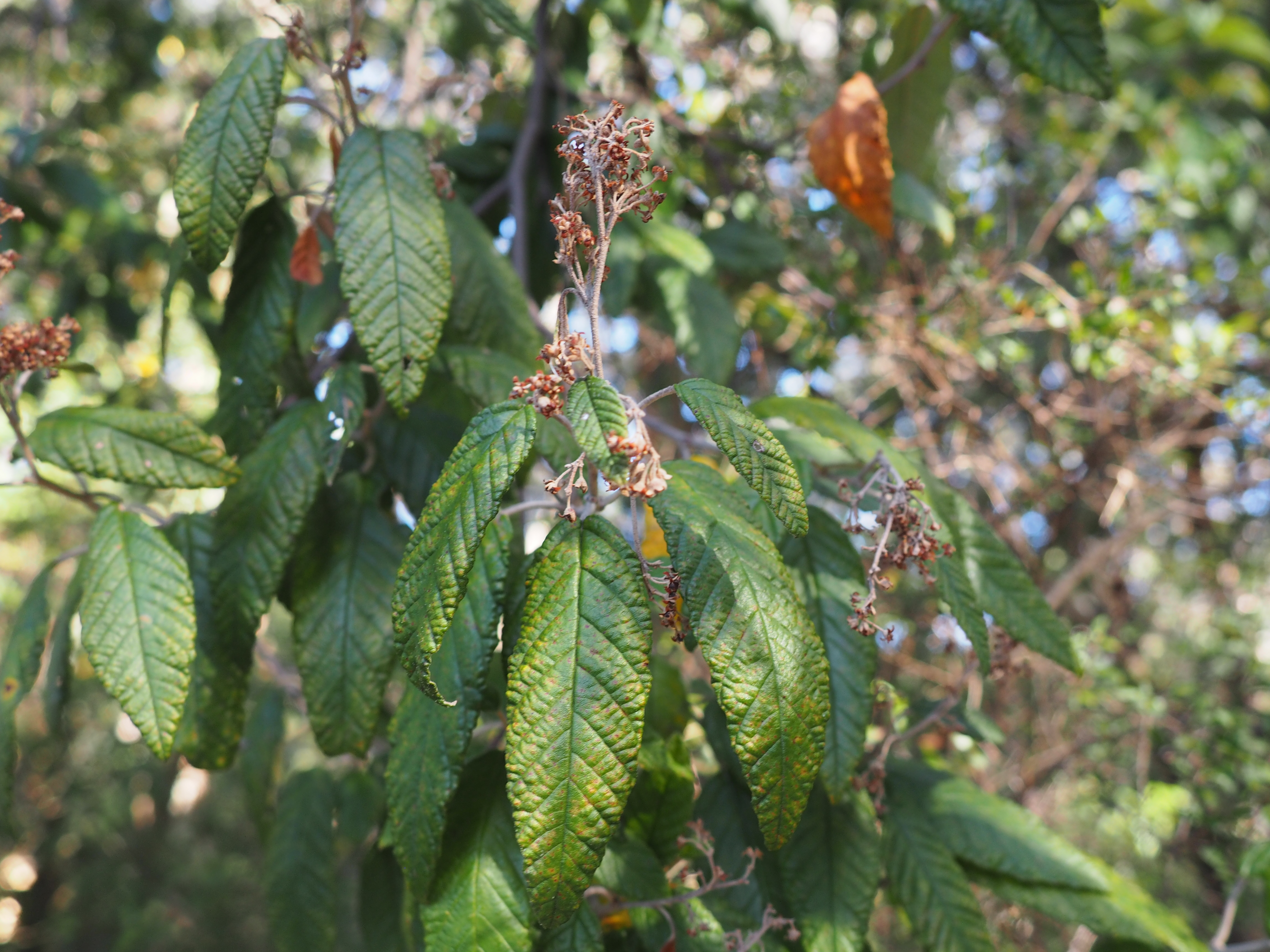
Pomaderris apetala with old fruiting bodies

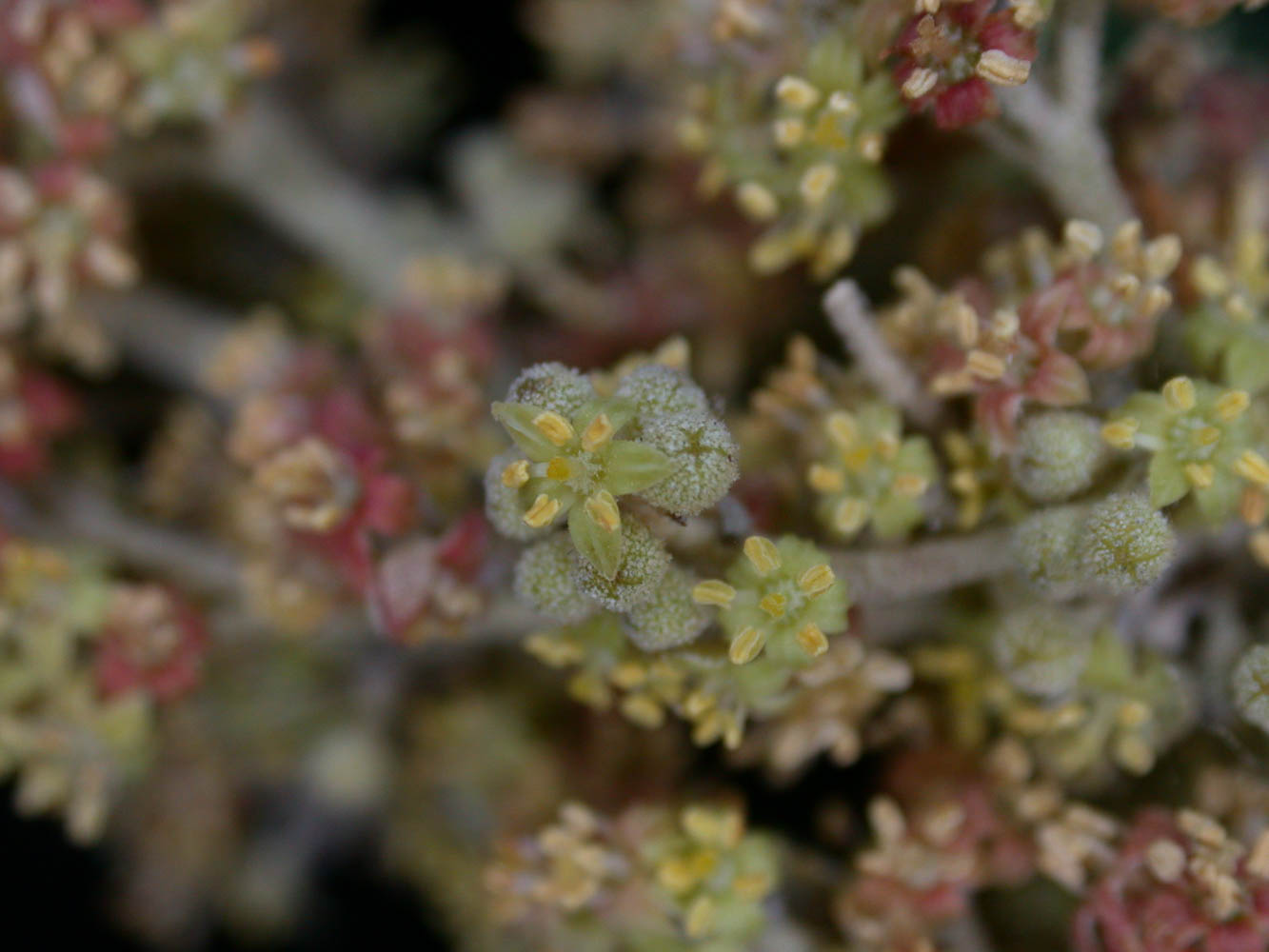
Pomaderris apetala with blossoming flowers, photo courtesy of Rob Wiltshire
