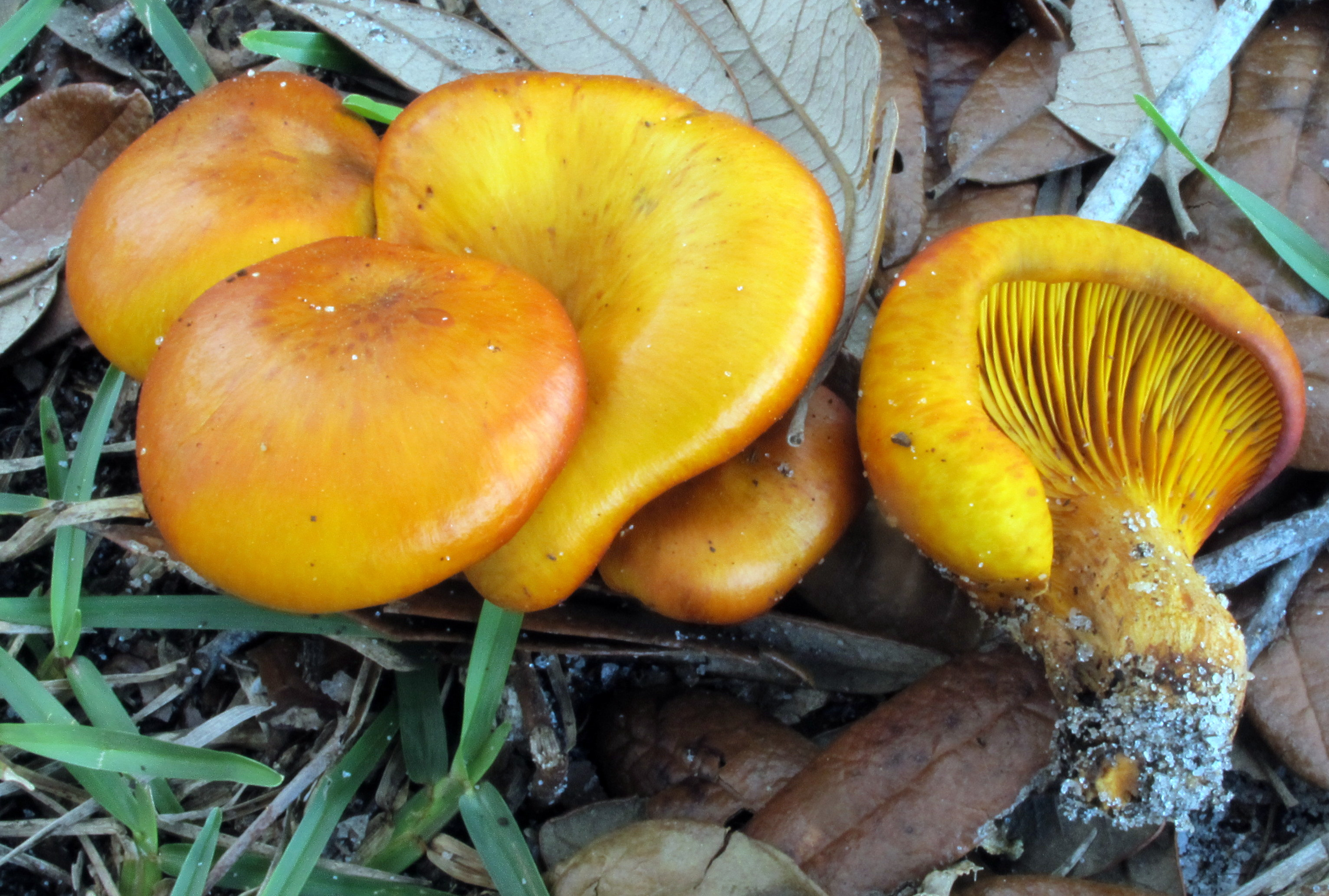

Scientific classification
- Kingdom: Fungi
- Division: Basidiomycota
- Class: Agaricomycetes
- Order: Agaricales
- Family: Omphalotaceae
- Genus: Omphalotus
- Species: O. subilludens

Binomial name
- Omphalotus subilludens (Murrill) H.E. Bigelow 1982

Synonyms
- Clitocybe subilludens (Murrill) Murrill 1945; Monodelphus subilludens Murrill 1945

= Omphalotus subilludens =

Species of fungus

Omphalotus subilludens, commonly known as the Southern Jack O'lantern mushroom, is a basidiomycete fungi in the genus Omphalotus. It has been definitively recorded in Florida and Texas with reports of species in Arizona and Mexico. It fruits on dead and dying trees during warmer parts of the year, producing a fairly large orange to brown-orange fruiting body that occurs in clusters. It is most closely related to O. olivascans, O. olearius, and O. japonicus and has high cross compatibility with O. olivescans and O. olearis. It is poisonous to humans and animals when eaten but rarely produces life-threatening symptoms, usually poisonings are resolved in 24-48 hours, with the majority of symptoms being gastrointestinal. Compounds in these mushrooms have pharmacological potential with potential applications in anti-coagulants, cancer therapies, and antibiotics. It is also bioluminescent producing a faint glow around the gills through the oxidation of luciferase.

== Description ==
=== Fruiting Body Morphology ===
O. subilludens is a mushroom that fruits on dead and dying wood in the spring, summer, and fall with the most observations of the species being recorded in late summer and fall. The basidiocarp grows in clusters, has an unpleasant smell, and an unpleasant taste. The pileus has an orange to dark reddish brown surface that is convex to subexpanded and depressed to cone shaped in the center. The pileus can be up to 15cm wide. It is either glabrous, smooth, or wrinkled and the margin even, undulate, or lobed. The pileipellis has refractive hyphae and an orange to brown encrusting pigment. The gills can be bioluminescent and can be orange, orange-brown, to reddish brown in color and darken with age. The gills are decurrent and tightly packed around the margin. The stipe is a deep yellow to orange-yellow and the interior context is deep yellow to orange-yellow as well. The stipe is firm, often has eccentric placement and is subequal with longitudinal lines running down it and a glabrous texture.

=== Genetics and Spore Morphology ===
O. subilludens has a tetrapolar mating system. The spores are white in color ellipsoid, elongated, or ovoid in shape, and smooth. Spores are approximately 7-9 micrometers by 5 micrometers and no cystidia are found with the basidia. Another source states spores have an average length 7.0±0.5 micrometers with a range from 6.3 to 8.1 micrometers and an average width of 4.8±0.3 micrometers with a range from 4.2 to 5.8 micrometers. Spore morphology is a key characteristic in identifying O. subilludens from other Omphalotus species.

== Phylogeny ==
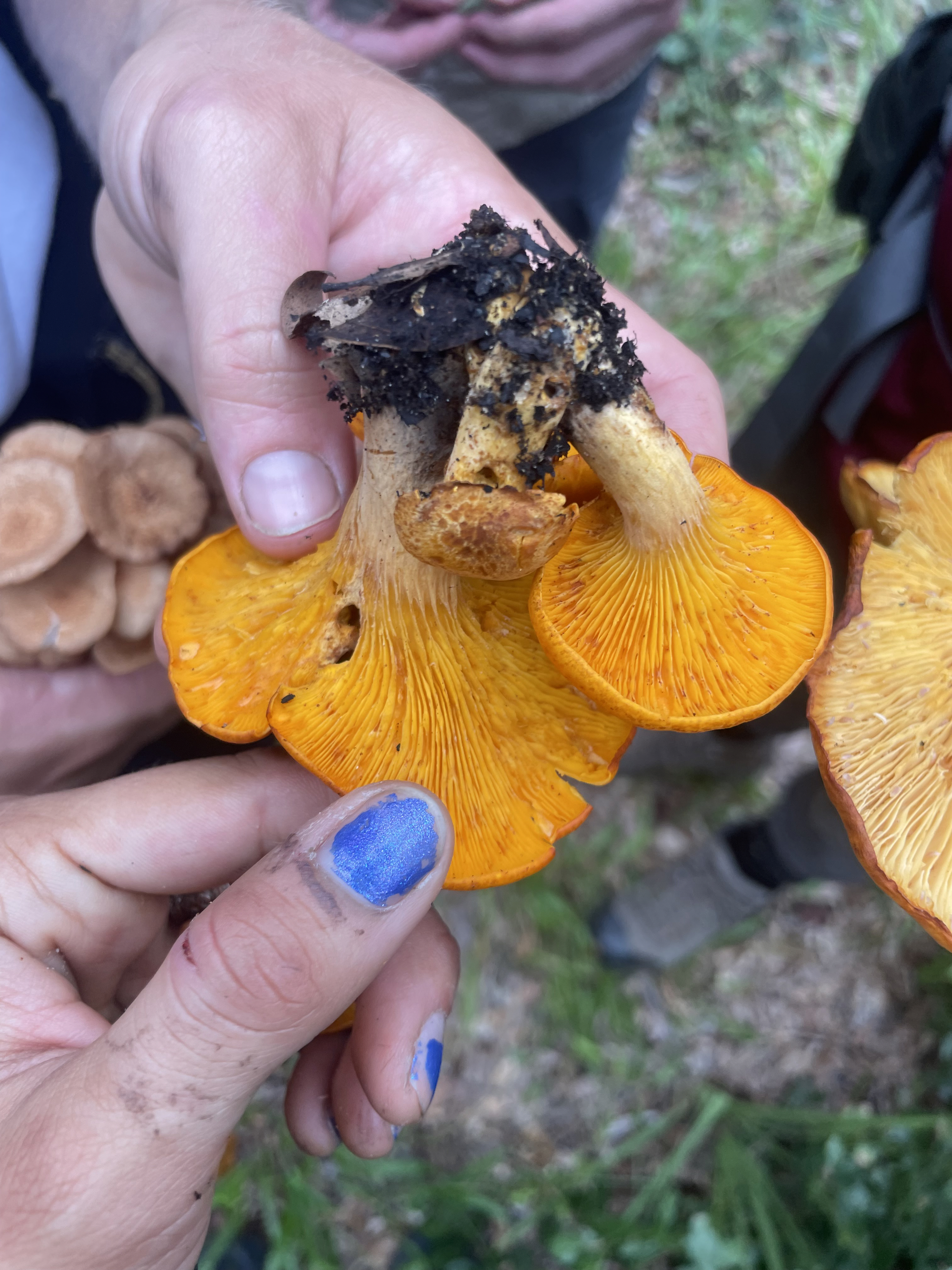
Young O. subilludens cluster collected from Fort McCoy, Florida

First collected by William A. Murrill on April 21, 1944 growing on a Phoenix carariensis palm tree in Gainesville, Florida, it was described as Monodelphus subilludens and synonymous with Clitocybe subilludens, later it was moved to the genus Omphalotus by H.E. Bigelow. Originally it was thought to be very closely related to O. illudens due to similar morphology with the only notable difference being spore morphology; however, this was found to not be true through ITS sequencing with a 7.35% difference in sequences calculated for the two morphologically similar species. It has been found through crossing studies and ITS sequencing that the genus Omphalotus comprises two distinct species complex clades. One clade is the O. olearius clade that includes O. subilludens, O. olivascens, O. japonicus, and O. olearius as its closest relatives and O. nidiformis being a distant outgroup in the clade as well. The other clade was the O. illudens clade which includes O. illudins and O. mexicanus. Crossing studies showed that O. subilludens had high compatibility with O. olearius and O. olivascens, yet all three species had low compatibility with O. illudens with O. subilludens and O. olivascens having dikaryon from only occurring in 1/3 of pairings with O.illudens and O. olearis having successful dikaryon in only 1/20 pairings with O.illudens. Some have even made a case for O. olearius, O. olivascens, and O. subilludens being considered one species due to the numerous morphological similarities; however, due to their different geographical ranges and slight differences in morphology are they still considered different species.

== Ecology ==
=== Habitat ===
O. subilludens is a saprobe that colonizes the stumps and roots of dead and dying hardwoods and palms. Some sources suggest a specialization to palms. However, both formal and informal observations counter this, with the species being sited on various wood types. O. subilludens is commonly found in hardwood forests and suburban areas where dead and dying trees occur. More research needs to be implemented to fully understand its life history.

=== Range ===
Specimens have been found in Florida and Texas with possible observations in Arizona and Mexico.

=== Poisonings ===
One significant interaction this mushrooms has with its environment is the potential poisoning of humans and animals. Although rarely life-threatening, the illudins contained in Omphalotus species can cause gastrointestinal distress and symptoms such as nausea, vomiting, diarrhea, and sweating. Poisoning symptoms can vary between species in the genus Omphalotus, with some species like O. olearius being shown to possibly have additional symptoms such as vertigo and drooling. Yet, species specific reports of poisoning from O. subilludins are lacking. Commonly this species is mistaken for chanterelles that also occur in its habitat.

== Biochemistry ==
=== Bioluminescence ===
O. subilludens, along with other members of the genus Omphalotus (but not all members) are able to produce a distinct glow from their gills via the action of the enzyme luciferase in the basidiocarp. This glow can be quite bright and be picked up with stunning detail in photography of the species in the dark.

=== Pharmacology ===
Atromentin and thelephoric acid are chemical compounds found in cultures of O. subilludens. Atromentin is an effective anticoagulant, and similar in biological activity to the well-known anticoagulant heparin. Atromentin also possesses antibacterial activity, inhibiting the enzyme enoyl-acyl carrier protein reductase (essential for the biosynthesis of fatty acids) in the bacteria Streptococcus pneumoniae.

O. subilludens has been found to contain illudins, a group of compounds with great potential in cancer therapies and antibiotics. Specifically the illudins illudidine and illudin M. Illudin M has been shown to have anti-bacterial activity against M. smegmatis and have high toxicity to leukemia cells. Because illudins are too toxic in their natural state for use in treatment, further research and development is needed. However, preliminary compounds have been derived from them and have shown promise. Illudin derivatives have been shown to be effective in vitro, in vivo, and made it to early clinical trials with promising effects.

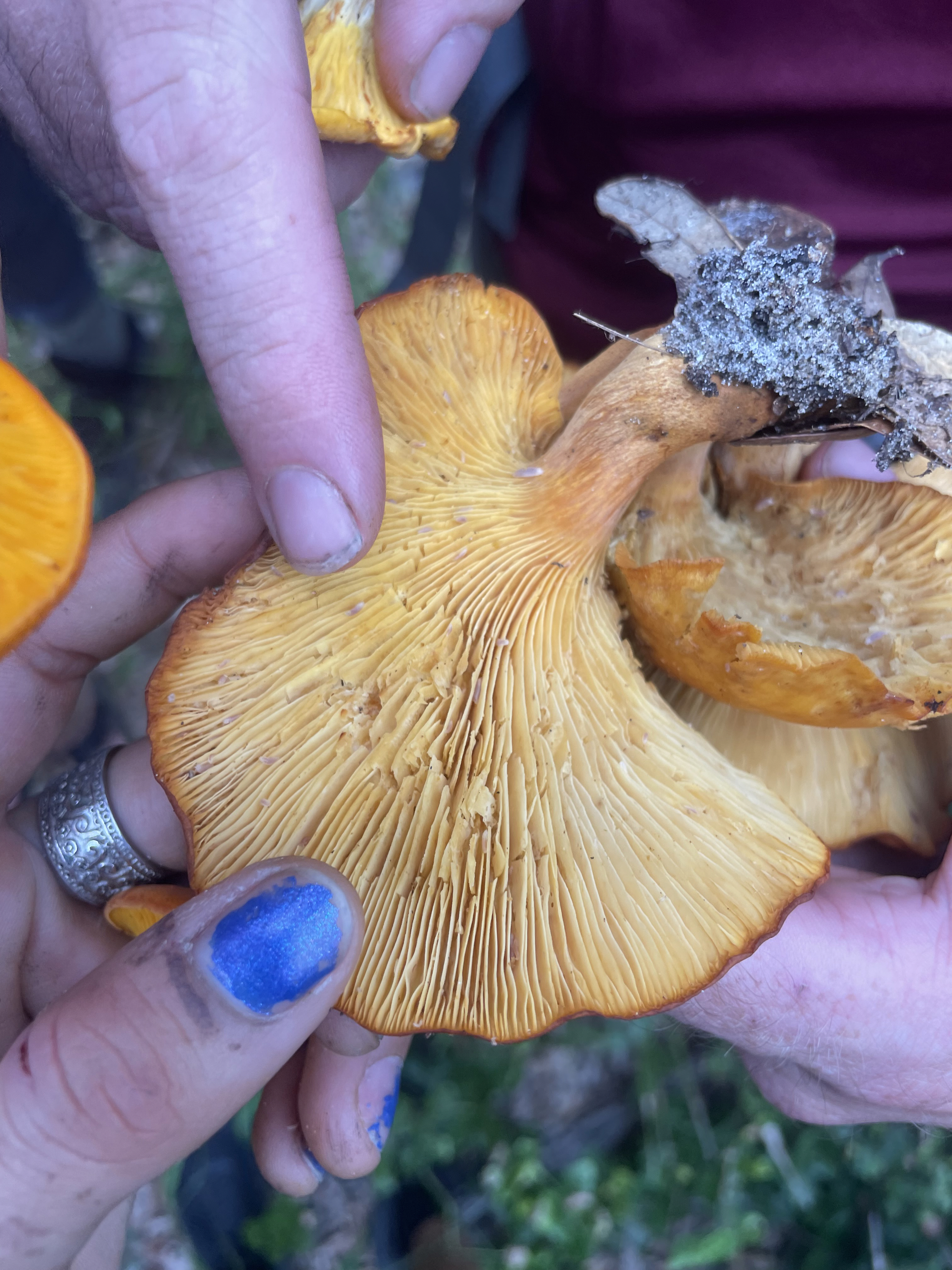
Older O subilldens cluster from Fort McCoy, Florida
