= Omphalotus flagelliformis =

Scientific classification
- Domain: Eukaryota
- Kingdom: Fungi
- Division: Basidiomycota
- Class: Agaricomycetes
- Order: Agaricales
- Family: Omphalotaceae
- Genus: Omphalotus
- Species: O. flagelliformis

Binomial name
- Omphalotus flagelliformis Zhu L.Yang & B.Feng (2013)

Species of fungus

Omphalotus flagelliformis is a bioluminescent fungus native to Yunnan Province in southwestern China. Fruitbodies are reddish-brown to brown, with convex, flattened, or funnel-shaped caps typically 4–8 cm (1.6–3.1 in) in diameter. Described as new to science in 2013, the type collection was found the year previous in Kunming Botanical Garden at an elevation of 1,980 metres (6,500 ft). It was fruiting in a cluster around the base of a tree identified as being in the family Fagaceae. Molecular analysis suggests that Omphalotus flagelliformis is closely related to O. illudens and O. mexicanus. The specific epithet flagelliformis refers to the "flagelliform" (long, slender, and flexible) appendages of the cheilocystidia.

== See also ==
- List of bioluminescent fungi
