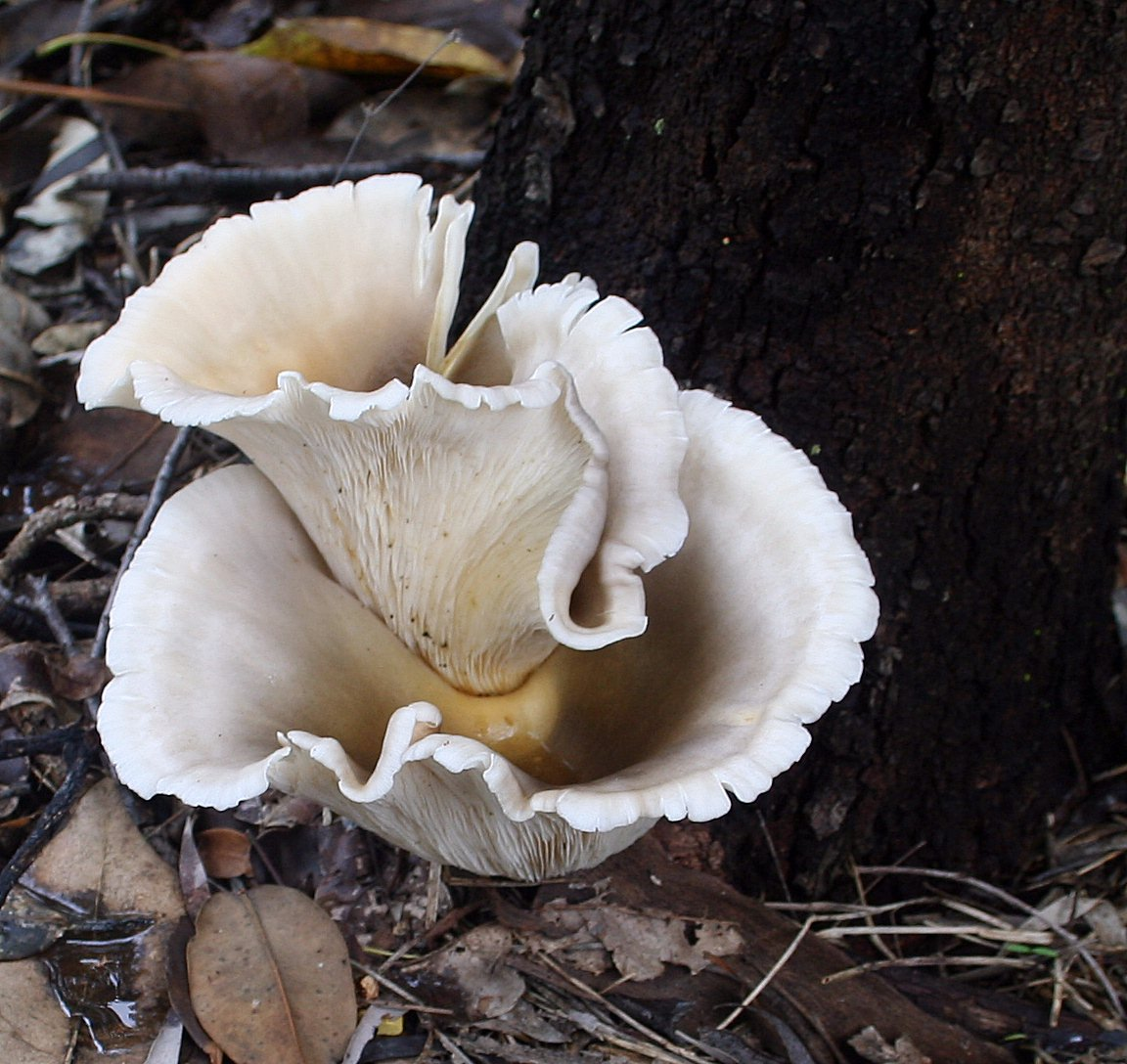

Scientific classification
- Kingdom: Fungi
- Division: Basidiomycota
- Class: Agaricomycetes
- Order: Agaricales
- Family: Omphalotaceae
- Genus: Omphalotus
- Species: O. nidiformis

Binomial name
- Omphalotus nidiformis (Berk.) O.K. Mill. (1994)

Synonyms
- Species synonymy: Agaricus nidiformis Berk. (1844); Agaricus lampas Berk. (1845); Agaricus phosphorus Berk. (1848); Agaricus noctilucus Berk. (1872); Panus incandescens Berk. & Broome (1883); Pleurotus lampas (Berk.) Sacc. (1887); Pleurotus nidiformis (Berk.) Sacc. (1887); Pleurotus phosphorus (Berk.) Sacc. (1887); Dendrosarcus lampas (Berk.) Kuntze (1898); Dendrosarcus berkeleyi Kuntze (1898); Dendrosarcus nidiformis (Berk.) Kuntze (1898); Lentinus incandescens (Berk. & Broome) Henn. (1898); Pocillaria incandescens (Berk. & Broome) Kuntze (1898)

= Omphalotus nidiformis =

Species of bioluminescent fungus in the family Marasmiaceae

Omphalotus nidiformis
- Mycological characteristics
- Gills on hymenium
- Cap is infundibuliform
- Hymenium is decurrent
- Stipe is bare
- Spore print is white
- Ecology is saprotrophic or parasitic
- Edibility is poisonous

Omphalotus nidiformis, or ghost fungus, is a gilled basidiomycete mushroom most notable for its bioluminescent properties. It is known to be found primarily in southern Australia and Tasmania, but was reported from India in 2012 and 2018. The fan or funnel shaped fruit bodies are up to 30 cm (12 in) across, with cream-coloured caps overlain with shades of orange, brown, purple, or bluish-black. The white or cream gills run down the length of the stipe, which is up to 8 cm (3 in) long and tapers in thickness to the base. The fungus is both saprotrophic and parasitic, and its fruit bodies are generally found growing in overlapping clusters on a wide variety of dead or dying trees.

First described scientifically in 1844, the fungus has been known by several names in its taxonomic history. It was assigned its current name by Orson K. Miller, Jr. in 1994. Its epithet name is derived from the Latin nidus "nest", hence 'nest shaped'. Similar in appearance to the common edible oyster mushroom, it was previously considered a member of the same genus, Pleurotus, and described under the former names Pleurotus nidiformis or Pleurotus lampas. Unlike oyster mushrooms, O. nidiformis is poisonous; while not lethal, its consumption leads to severe cramps and vomiting. The toxic properties of the mushroom are attributed to compounds called illudins.

== Taxonomy and naming ==
The ghost fungus was initially described in 1844 by English naturalist Miles Joseph Berkeley as Agaricus nidiformis. Berkeley felt it was related to Agaricus ostreatus (now Pleurotus ostreatus) but remarked it was a "far more magnificent species". Material was originally collected by Scottish naturalist James Drummond in 1841 on Banksia wood along the Swan River. He wrote "when this fungus was laid on a newspaper, it emitted by night a phosphorescent light, enabling us to read the words around it; and it continued to do so for several nights with gradually decreasing intensity as the plant dried up." More material collected from near the base of a "sickly but living" shrub (Grevillea drummondii) was named as Agaricus lampas by Berkeley. He noted both were phosphorescent and closely related species. Tasmanian botanist Ronald Campbell Gunn collected material in October 1845 from that state, which Berkeley felt differed from previous collections in having more demarcated and less decurrent gills and a shorter stipe, and named it Agaricus phosphorus in 1848. Italian mycologist Pier Andrea Saccardo placed all three named taxa in the genus Pleurotus in 1887. These names have been synonymised with O. nidiformis, although the name Pleurotus lampas persisted in some texts, including the 1934–35 monograph of Australian fungi by John Burton Cleland. In reviewing the published literature, Victorian botanical liaison officer Jim Willis was aware of Rolf Singer's placing of Pleurotus olearius into the genus Omphalotus, but stopped short of transferring the ghost fungus across, even though he conceded it was wrongly placed in Pleurotus. Investigating the species in 1994, Orson K. Miller, Jr. gave the ghost fungus its current binomial name when he transferred it to the genus Omphalotus with other bioluminescent mushrooms.

The specific epithet nidiformis is derived from the Latin terms nīdus 'nest' and forma 'shape' or 'form', hence 'nest shaped'. Lampas is derived from the Greek lampas/λαμπας 'torch'. Common names include ghost fungus and Australian glow fungus. Drummond reported that the local Aboriginal people were fearful when shown the luminescent fungus and called out chinga, a local word for spirit; Drummond himself likened it to a will-o'-the-wisp. On the Springbrook Plateau in southeastern Queensland, the local Kombumerri people believed the lights to be ancestors and gave the area a wide berth out of respect.

The effect produced by it upon the traveller, when on a dark night he comes suddenly upon it glowing in the woods, is startling; for to a person unacquainted with this phenomenon the pale, livid, and deadly light emanating from it conveys to him an impression of something supernatural, and often causes no little degree of terror in weak minds or in those willing to believe in supernatural agencies.

— Mordecai Cubitt Cooke

Several Omphalotus species with similar bioluminescent properties occur worldwide, all of which are presumed poisonous. The best known are the North American jack o'lantern mushroom (O. olearius) and the tsukiyotake (O. japonicus (Kawam.) Kirchm. & O.K. Mill. (formerly known as Lampteromyces japonicus (Kawam.) Sing.), found in Japan and eastern Asia. A 2004 molecular study shows the ghost fungus to be most closely related to the western jack o'lantern mushroom (O. olivascens), which is abundant in Southern and Central California. Miller notes that the colours and shades of the ghost fungus most closely resemble this species.

Laboratory breeding experiments with it and other Omphalotus species have revealed a low level of compatibility (ability to breed and produce fertile hybrids), suggesting it is genetically distinct and has been isolated for a long time. It is particularly poorly compatible with O. illudens, the authors of the study suggesting the separation may have been as long ago as the Late Carboniferous separation of Gondwana from Laurasia but conceding the lack of any fossil record makes it impossible to know whether the genus even existed at the time.

=== Variation ===
Miller noted there appeared to be two colour forms reported across its range, namely a more cream-coloured form with darker shades of brown and grey in its cap that darkens with age, and a more wholly brownish form with paler edges and darker centre to its cap. He found the cream-coloured form to be strongly luminescent—the brightest of any fungus in the genus—with the cap, stipe and gills all glowing. The brown form was generally fainter, with its luminescence restricted to the gills. However, some strongly luminescent wholly brown-coloured mushrooms were recorded, and laboratory experiments showed all interbred freely and produced fertile offspring, leading Miller to conclude that these were phenotypic variants of a single taxon.

== Description ==
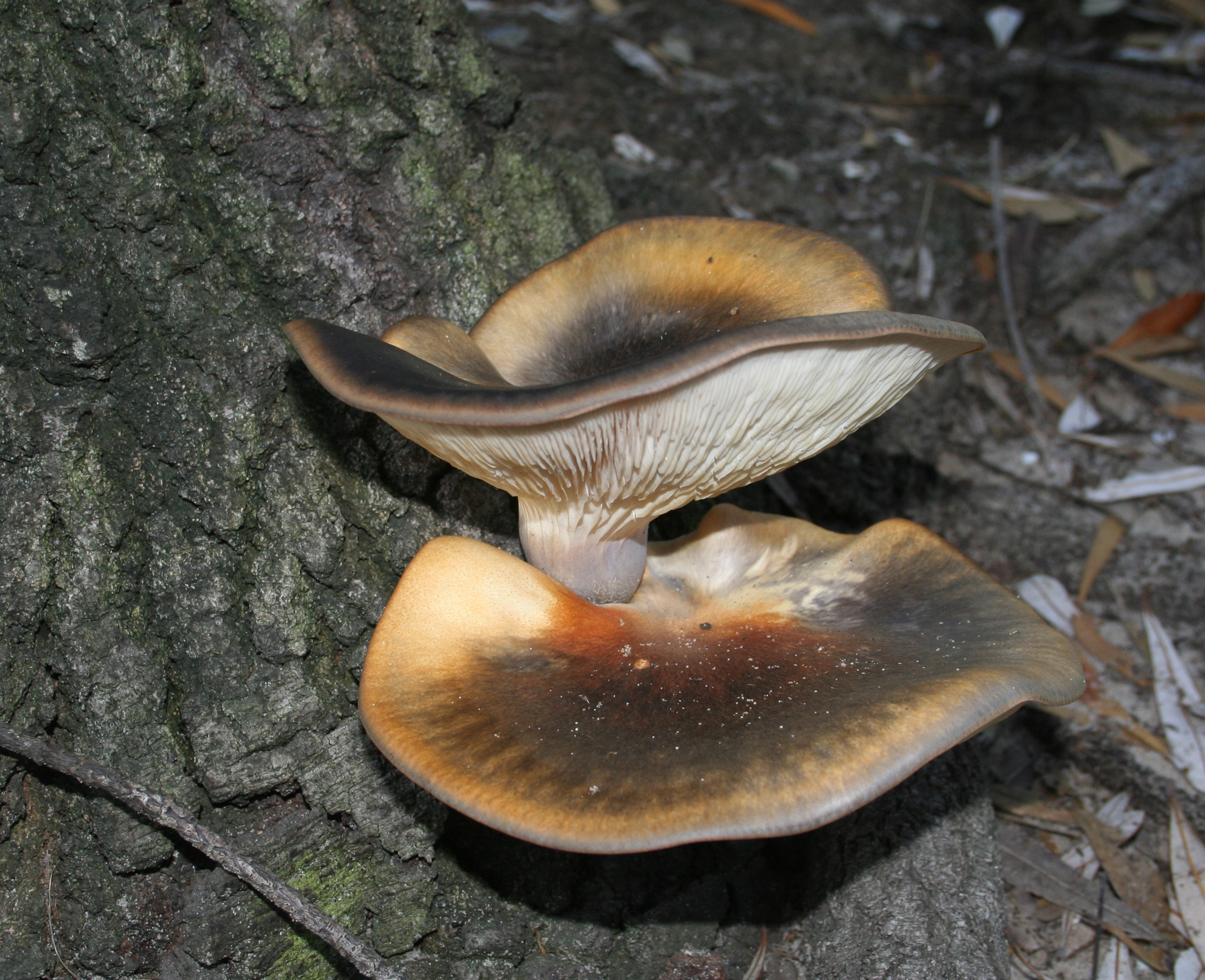
Darker-coloured fruit bodies, Botany, Sydney

The fruit bodies of the ghost fungus can be found on dead or diseased wood. They may be first seen at night as a pale whitish glow at the base of trees in a eucalypt forest. The cap is very variable in colour, sometimes cream though often tinted with orange, brownish, greyish, purple or even bluish-black shades. The margin is lighter, generally cream, though brown forms have tan or brown edges. The centre generally has several darker shades, and younger specimens are often darker. Growing up to 30 cm (12 in) in diameter it is funnel-shaped or fan-shaped in appearance with inrolled margins. The cream-white gills are decurrent and often drip with moisture. They are up to 13 mm (0.5 in) deep, somewhat distant to closely spaced, and have a smooth edge until they erode in maturity. The stipe may be central to lateral in its attachment to the cap and is up to 8 cm (3 in) long and tapers to the base. The thin flesh is generally creamy white in colour, but can have reddish tones near the base of the stipe. There is no distinctive smell or taste. The spore print is white.

The spores are roughly elliptical, or, less commonly, somewhat spherical, and have dimensions of 7.5–9.5 by 5–7 μm. They are thin-walled, inamyloid, and have a smooth surface. Each features a prominent hilar appendage. The basidia (spore-bearing cells), measuring 32–42 by 6–9 μm, are club-shaped and four-spored, with sterigmata up to 7 μm long. Cheilocystidia (cystidia found on the gill edges) are abundant, and measure 15–40 by 3–6 μm; no pleurocystida (cystidia on the gill faces) are present. The cap cuticle comprises a thin layer of 3–6 μm-wide hyphae that are interwoven either loosely or tightly. All hyphae of O. nidiformis have clamp connections.

O. nidiformis' bioluminescent gills

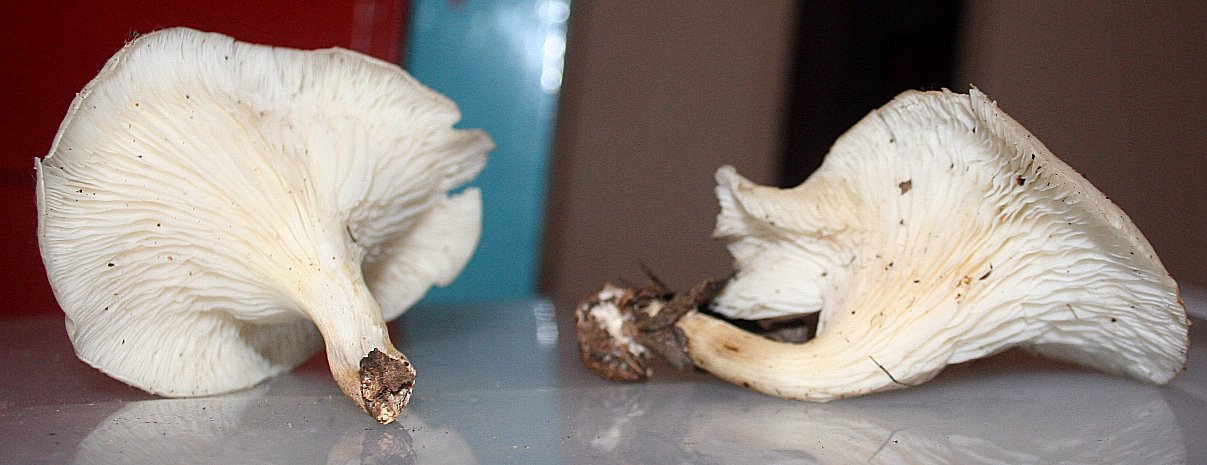
Light on

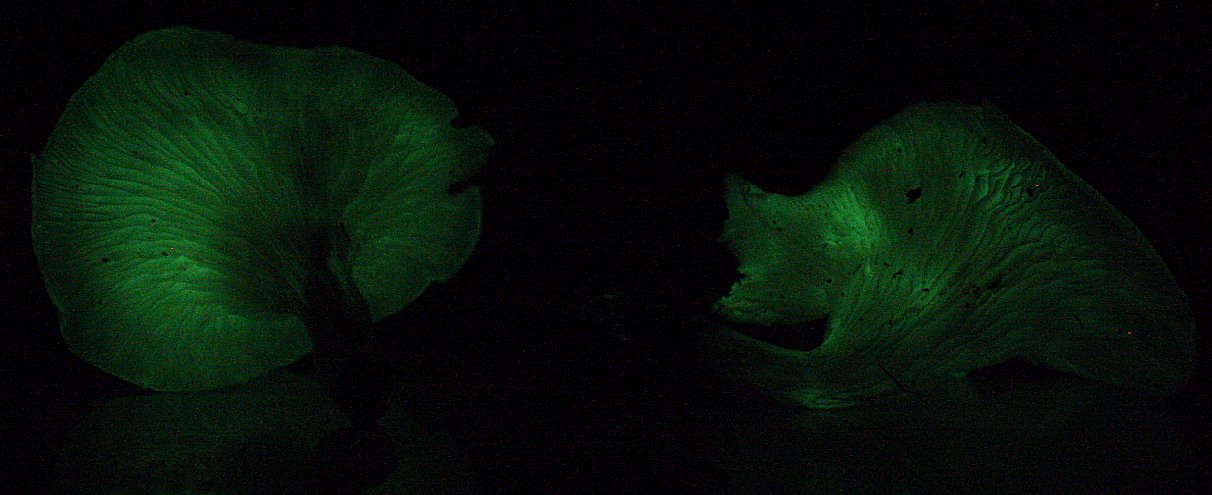
Light off

The bioluminescence of O. nidiformis fruit bodies is best seen in low-light conditions when the viewer's eyes have become dark-adapted. The gills are the most luminescent part of the fungus, emitting a greenish light that fades with age. Although the intensity of the luminescence is variable, William Henry Harvey once reported that it was bright enough to read a watch face by. It is not known if the mycelium is also luminescent.

Omphalotus nidiformis may be confused with the edible brown oyster mushroom (Pleurotus australis), which is brown and does not glow in the dark. Confusion with another edible lookalike, Pleurotus ostreatus, common in the Northern Hemisphere and cultivated commercially, has been the source for at least one case of poisoning reported in the literature.

== Distribution and habitat ==
Omphalotus nidiformis occurs in two disjunct ranges in southern Australia. In southwest Western Australia, it has been recorded from Perth and the Avon wheatbelt southwest to Augusta and east along the southern coastline to Esperance. In the southeast of the continent, it is found from eastern South Australia, where it has been recorded from Mount Gambier and the Fleurieu Peninsula, the Mount Lofty Ranges around Adelaide, the Murraylands, and north to the Flinders Ranges and from Lincoln National Park at the apex of the Eyre Peninsula, through to southeast Queensland. It also occurs in Tasmania. It can be found in eucalypt and pine forests, in habitats as diverse as the arid scrubland of Wyperfeld National Park and subalpine areas of Mount Buffalo National Park, as well as in urban parks and gardens. Fruit bodies can be numerous and occur in overlapping clusters on dead wood. Outside Australia, it has been recorded from Norfolk Island. In 2012, it was reported for the first time from Kerala, India, where it was discovered growing on a coconut tree stump.

== Ecology ==
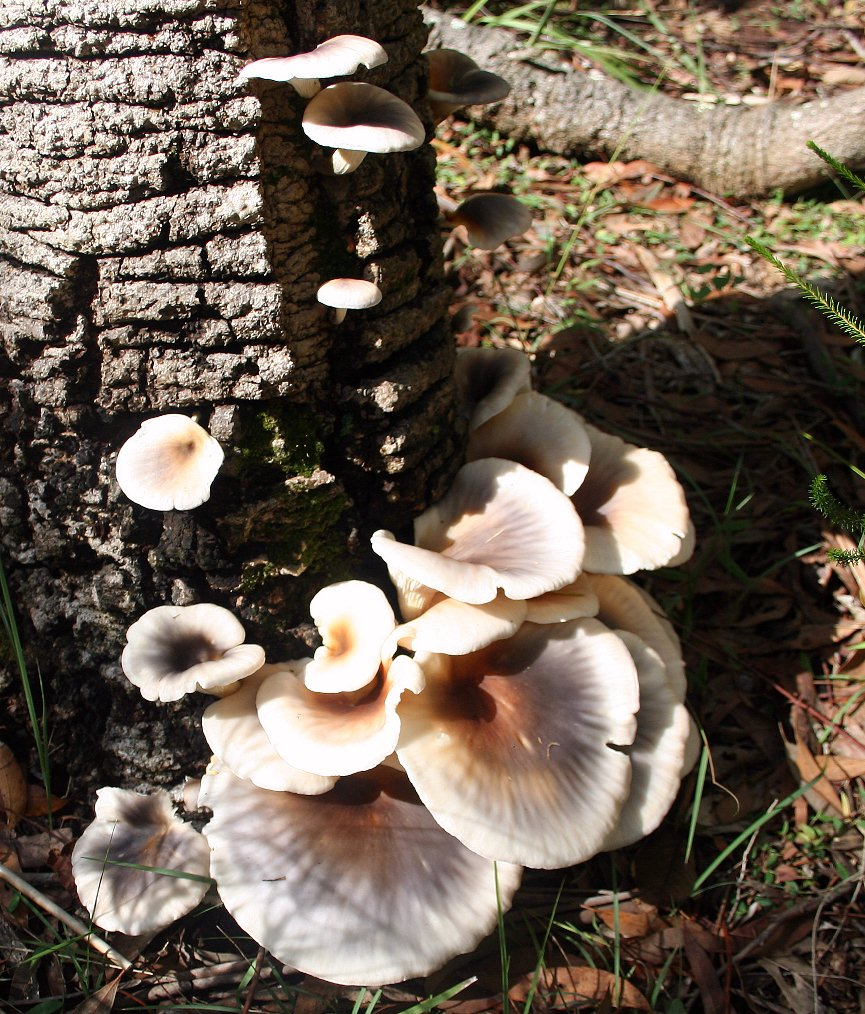
Fruit bodies growing out of deep fissures in the bark of a dead Banksia serrata tree, Sylvan Grove Native Garden, Picnic Point, New South Wales

A saprobe or parasite, O. nidiformis is nonspecific in its needs and is compatible with a wide variety of hosts. It has been recorded on native Banksia (including B. attenuata and B. menziesii), Hakea, Acacia, Nuytsia floribunda and various Myrtaceae, including Agonis flexuosa and Melaleuca species, and especially Eucalyptus, as well as Nothofagus, Casuarina species and Allocasuarina fraseriana, and even introduced trees such as Pinus or Platanus species. It plays an important role in breaking down wood and recycling nutrients into the soil.

Omphalotus species cause a white rot by breaking down lignin in their tree hosts. The fungus infiltrates the heartwood of the tree via a breach in its bark, either by a branch falling, damage from insects or mistletoe, or by mechanical damage from logging. O. nidiformis has been implicated in the heartwood rot of several species of eucalypt around Australia, including marri (Corymbia calophylla) in southwest Western Australia, in spotted gum (C. maculata) and messmate (Eucalyptus obliqua) in New South Wales, and in blackbutt (E. pilularis), Sydney blue gum (E. saligna), red stringybark (E. macrorhyncha) and Forth River peppermint (E. radiata) in Victoria.

The US Department of Agriculture considers there is a moderate to high risk of O. nidiformis being accidentally introduced to the United States in untreated eucalyptus woodchips from Australia. Nearly a century ago, Cleland and Edwin Cheel suggested that even though the fungus was of "no great economic importance", "it would be advisable to destroy it by burning wherever found."

Several species of Tapeigaster flies have been collected from the fruit bodies, including T. cinctipes, T. annulipes, and T. nigricornis; the latter species uses the fruit bodies as a host to rear its young. Fruit bodies in Springbrook National Park have been observed to attract nocturnal insects such as beetles, native cockroaches and crickets (white-kneed cricket (Papuastus spp.) and thorny cricket), as well as giant rainforest snails (Hedleyella falconeri) and red triangle slugs (Triboniophorus graeffei), which voraciously consume the fungus.

== Biochemistry ==
Omphalotus nidiformis is not edible. Although reputedly mild tasting, eating it will result in vomiting which generally occurs 30 minutes to two hours after consumption and lasts for several hours. There is no diarrhea and patients recover without lasting ill-effects. Its toxicity was first mentioned by Anthony M. Young in his 1982 guidebook Common Australian Fungi. The toxic ingredient of many species of Omphalotus is a sesquiterpene compound known as illudin S. This, along with illudin M and a co-metabolite illudosin, have been identified in O. nidiformis. The two illudins are common to the genus Omphalotus and not found in any other basidiomycete mushroom. An additional three compounds unique to O. nidiformis have been identified and named illudins F, G and H.

Irofulven, a compound derived from illuden S, is undergoing phase II clinical trials as a possible therapy for various types of cancers. Fruit body extracts have antioxidant and free radical scavenging properties, which may be attributed to the presence of phenolic compounds.

== See also ==
- List of bioluminescent fungi
