= Omphalotus mangensis =

Scientific classification
- Kingdom: Fungi
- Division: Basidiomycota
- Class: Agaricomycetes
- Order: Agaricales
- Family: Omphalotaceae
- Genus: Omphalotus
- Species: O. mangensis

Binomial name
- Omphalotus mangensis (Jian Z.Li & X.W.Hu) Kirchm. & O.K.Mill. (2002)

Synonyms
- Lampteromyces mangensis Jian Z.Li & X.W.Hu (1993)

Species of fungus

Omphalotus mangensis is a species of agaric fungus in the family Marasmiaceae. Found in China, the fruit bodies of the fungus are bioluminescent.

== See also ==
- List of bioluminescent fungi
