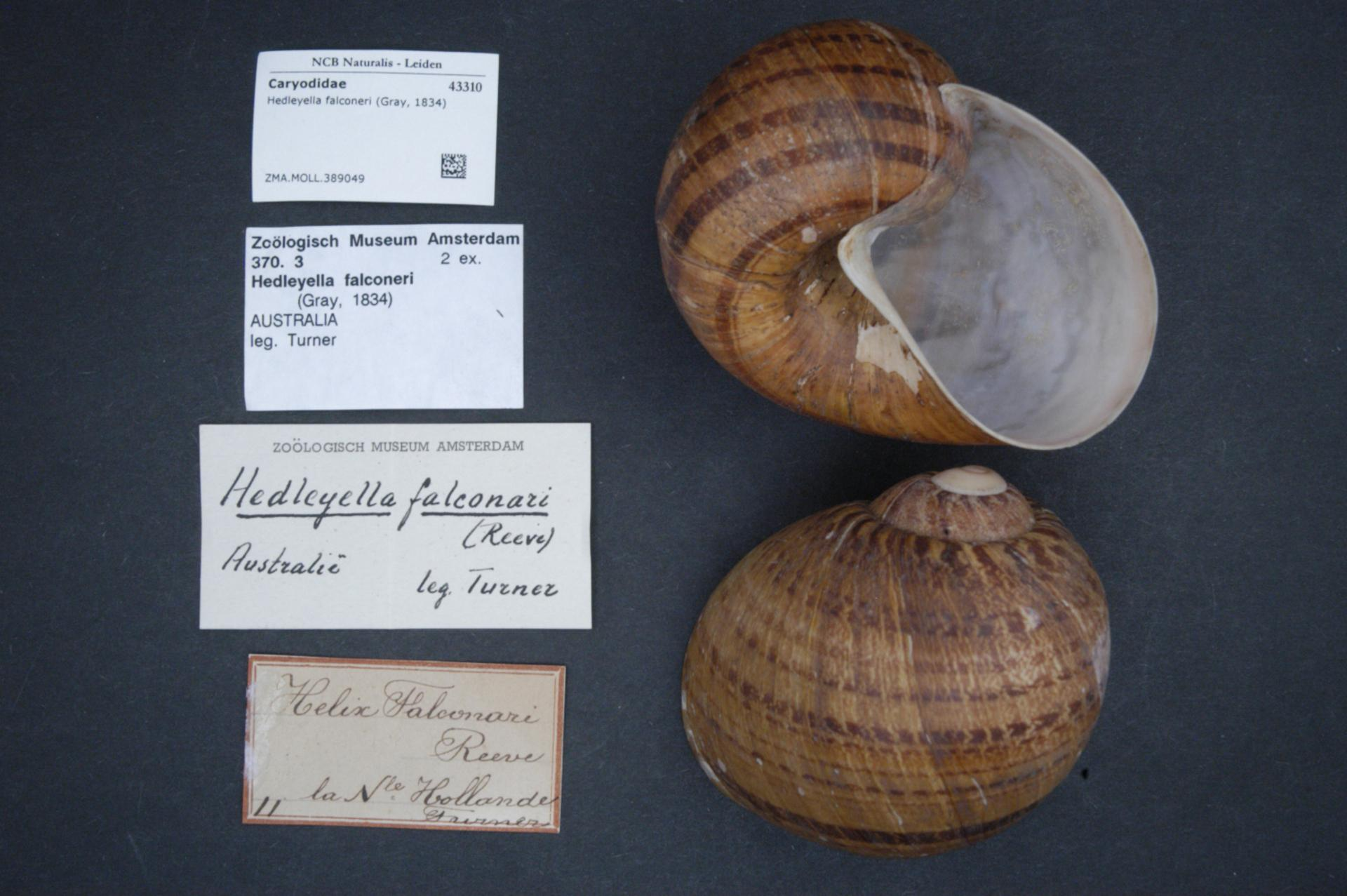

Scientific classification
- Kingdom: Animalia
- Phylum: Mollusca
- Class: Gastropoda
- Order: Stylommatophora
- Family: Caryodidae
- Genus: Hedleyella
- Species: H. falconeri

Binomial name
- Hedleyella falconeri (Grey, 1834)

= Hedleyella falconeri =

Species of gastropod

Hedleyella falconeri, the giant panda snail, is a species of air-breathing land snail, a terrestrial pulmonate gastropod mollusc in the family Caryodidae. It is the largest species of land snail to be found in Australia.

== Description ==
Hedleyella falconeri has a helicoid (spiral) shell which grows to a diameter of about 90mm (3.5"). The colour is some shade of brown marked with radially arranged irregular bands and splotches of black. When the snail is quiescent, the head and foot are retracted into the shell, but these are extended when the animal wants to move around and feed. The upper surface of head and foot has a reticulate pattern in grey and the foot is rimmed with orange. The head bears two pairs of retractable, dark-coloured tentacles, the upper pair, with the eyes on their tips, being twice as long as the lower pair. There is a dark line leading from between the tentacles along the nape of the neck.

== Distribution and habitat ==
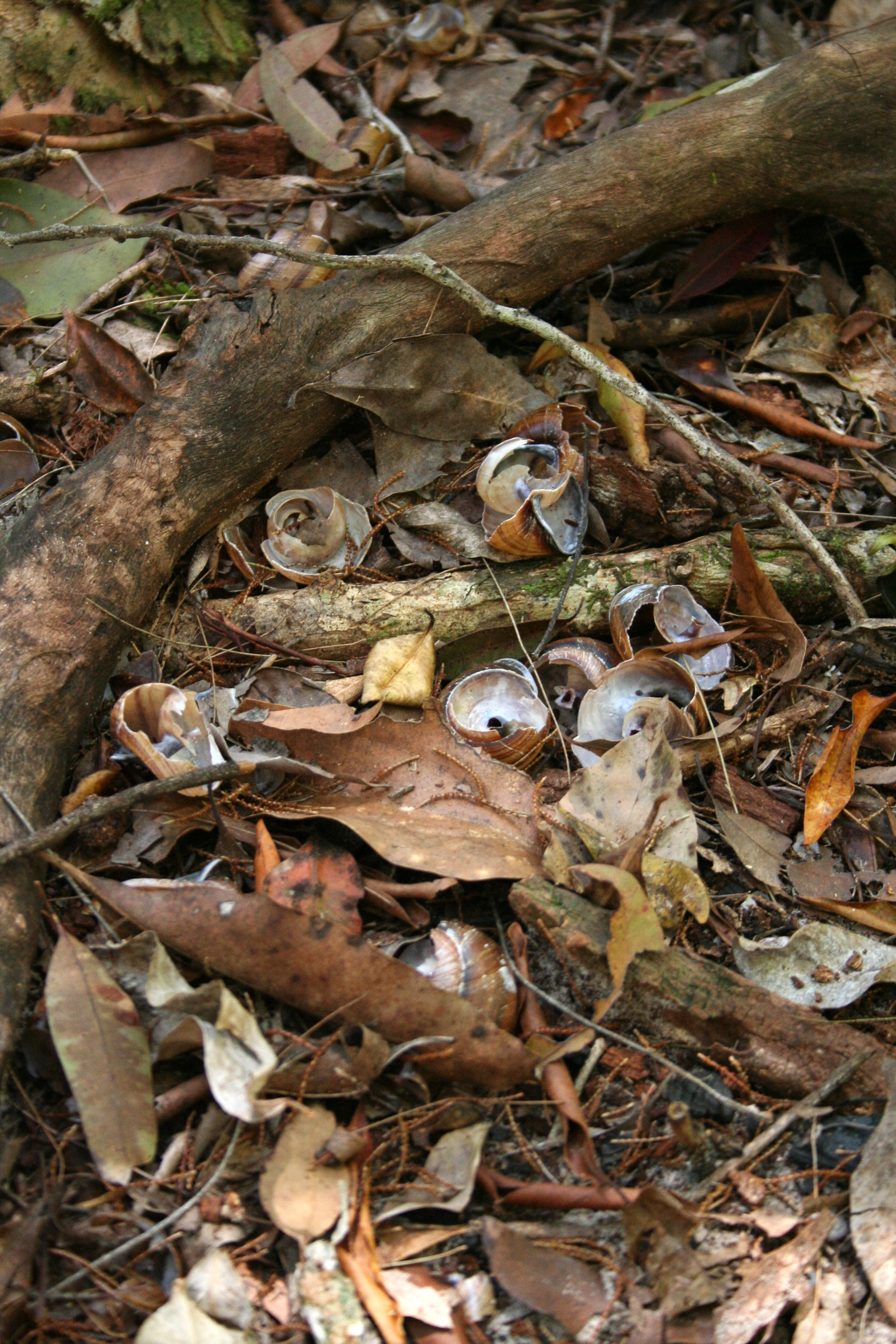
Noisy pitta anvil with broken snail shells

Hedleyella falconeri is found in subtropical eastern Australia from Smiths Lake in New South Wales to just north of Brisbane. Its western limit is the Great Dividing Range. It lives on the forest floor among leaf litter and mossy logs and has not been observed to climb up trees to heights of more than 0.5 metres (1 ft 8 in).

== Biology ==
Hedleyella falconeri is nocturnal. It spends the day stationary and may hide itself under a rotting log or similar location but often remains in the open although it is usually at least partially covered in leaf litter. On most nights it starts to move around and feed, favouring wet nights. In a study, the average distance travelled by a snail in any night on which it moved was 8.7 metres (29 ft). It appeared to wander at random and did not seem to have a homing instinct.

Hedleyella falconeri is a fungivore and feeds on the fruiting bodies of such fungi as Polyporus varius and the bioluminescent fungus Omphalotus nidiformis. It may also feed on rotting leaves on the forest floor. It is itself eaten by a number of birds including the noisy pitta (Pitta versicolor) which smashes the shell on a hard surface, the Albert's lyrebird (Menura alberti) and the superb lyrebird (Menura novaehollandiae).

Hedleyella falconeri is a hermaphrodite and mating usually occurs in February. Two snails come together overnight and each deposits a sac of sperm in a reproductive opening in the other. Fertilisation is internal and some time later, each snail lays a batch of up to twenty eggs. These are cream coloured and nearly spherical, weigh 2 g (0.07 oz) and measure 18 millimetres (0.71 in) in diameter. The eggs are buried in a cavity under the leaf litter and take about six weeks to hatch. The juvenile snails that emerge are about 18 millimetres (0.71 in) long and grow slowly.
