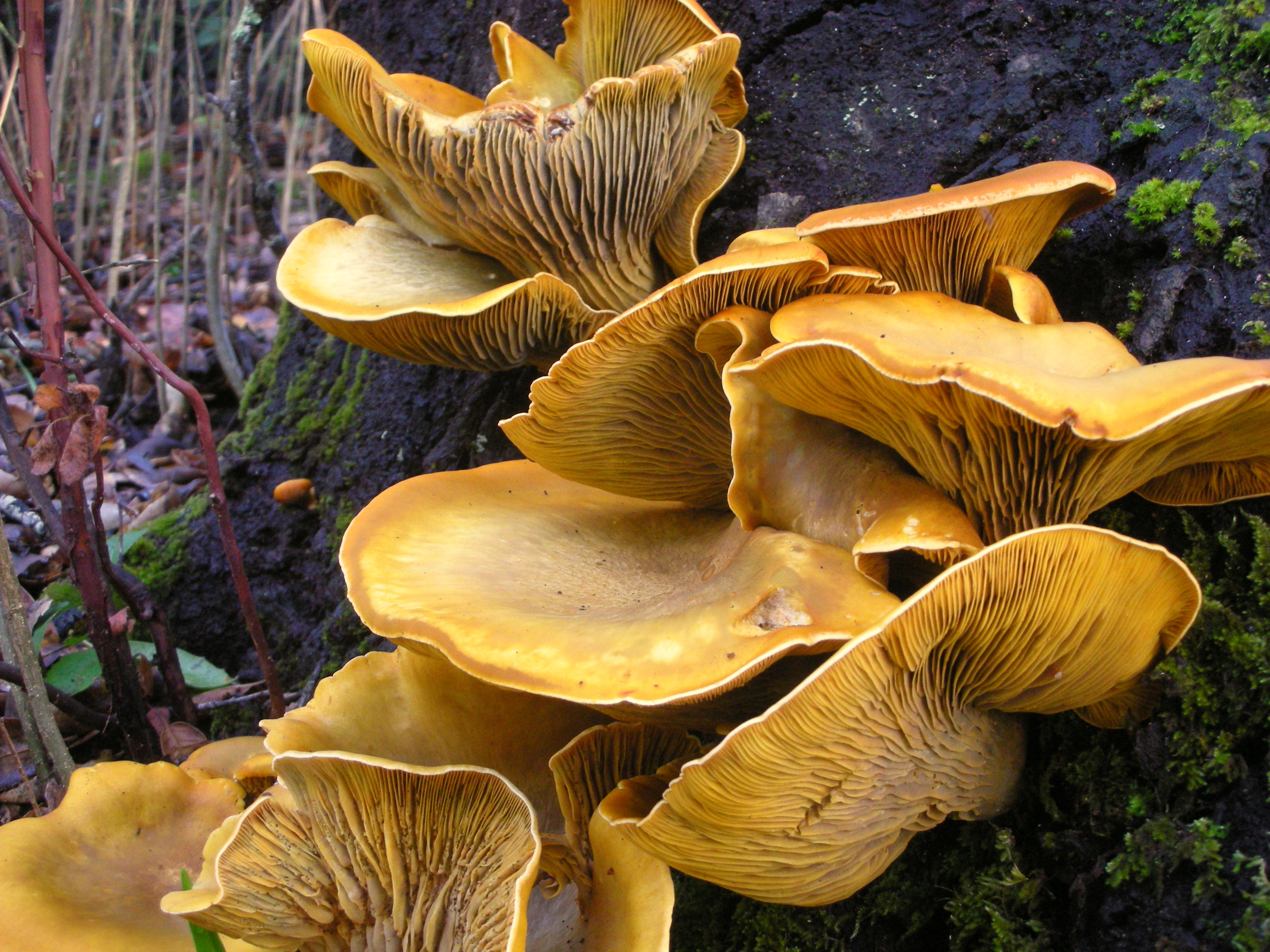

Scientific classification
- Kingdom: Fungi
- Division: Basidiomycota
- Class: Agaricomycetes
- Order: Agaricales
- Family: Omphalotaceae
- Genus: Omphalotus
- Species: O. olivascens

Binomial name
- Omphalotus olivascens H.E.Bigelow, O.K.Mill. & Thiers (1976)

= Omphalotus olivascens =

Species of fungus

Omphalotus olivascens Mycological characteristics
- Gills on hymenium
- Cap is infundibuliform
- Hymenium is decurrent
- Stipe is bare
- Spore print is yellow
- Ecology is saprotrophic
- Edibility is poisonous

Omphalotus olivascens, commonly known as the western jack-o'-lantern mushroom, is an orange to brown-colored gilled poisonous mushroom endemic to the North American west coast. It has several lookalikes including Cantharellus cibarius.

== Taxonomy ==
The fungus was described as new to science in 1976 by American mycologists Howard E. Bigelow, Orson K. Miller Jr., and Harry D. Thiers. A subspecies with blue flesh, O. olivascens var. indigo, was described growing on live oak in Baja California, Mexico.

== Description ==
The cap is 4–18 cm (1.6–7.1 in) wide. The stalks are 4–15 cm (1.6–5.9 in) long and 1–4 cm (0.39–1.57 in) wide. The spores are white to pale yellow.

=== Similar species ===
To an untrained eye, O. olivascens appears similar to Cantharellus cibarius, but the jack-o'-lantern mushroom has true, blade-like gills (rather than ridges) and it can have olive coloration that chanterelles lack; also, Omphalotus species are saprotrophic, grow directly on wood, and are bioluminescent.

Several Omphalotus species with similar bioluminescent properties occur worldwide, all of which are presumed poisonous. The best known are the North American jack o'lantern mushroom (O. olearius) and the tsukiyotake (O. japonicus (Kawam.) Kirchm. & O.K. Mill. (formerly known as Lampteromyces japonicus (Kawam.) Sing.), found in Japan and eastern Asia. Molecular analysis shows the jack-o'-lantern to be most closely related to the ghost fungus O. nidiformis, the colours and shades of which most closely resemble O. olivascens. Additionally, O. illudens is similar.

Gymnopilus junonius is another similar-looking species.

== Distribution and habitat ==
It is endemic to the North American west coast, namely the California Floristic Province.

== Ecology ==
A saprobe or parasite, O. olivascens is usually found on oak or Eucalyptus, rarely on other hosts.

Omphalotus species cause a white rot by breaking down lignin in their tree hosts.

== Toxicity ==
The jack o'lantern mushroom is poisonous; while not lethal, consuming this mushroom leads to very severe cramps, vomiting, and diarrhea.

The toxic ingredient of many species of Omphalotus is a sesquiterpene compound known as illudin S. This, along with illudin M, have been identified in O. nidiformis. The two illudins are common to the genus Omphalotus and not found in any other basidiomycete mushroom.

== See also ==
- List of bioluminescent fungi
