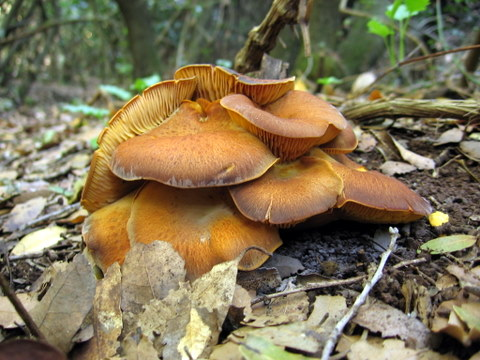
- Omphalotus olearius

Scientific classification
- Kingdom: Fungi
- Division: Basidiomycota
- Class: Agaricomycetes
- Order: Agaricales
- Family: Omphalotaceae
- Genus: Omphalotus; Fayod (1889)

Type species
- Omphalotus olearius (DC.) Singer (1946)

Synonyms
- Monadelphus Earle (1909)

= Omphalotus =

Genus of fungi

Omphalotus
- Mycological characteristics
- Gills on hymenium
- Cap is depressed or infundibuliform
- Hymenium is decurrent
- Stipe is bare
- Spore print is yellow
- Ecology is saprotrophic
- Edibility is poisonous

Omphalotus is a genus of basidiomycete mushroom, in the family Omphalotaceae, formally circumscribed by Victor Fayod in 1889. Members have the traditional cap and stem structure. They are saprobic, and fruit in clumps on stumps or buried roots. The best-known and type species is the jack-o'-lantern mushroom (Omphalotus olearius). Omphalotus mushrooms have been mistaken for chanterelles. All Omphalotus species are presumed poisonous, causing severe gastrointestinal symptoms. Some Omphalotus species have bioluminescent properties.

== Taxonomy ==
Victor Fayod originally erected the genus with Pleurotus olearius and P. eryngii as its principal species in 1889, placing it in a tribus ("alliance") with the genera Pleurotus and Pleurotellus.

The relationships of the genus have become clearer with genetic analysis. Rolf Singer placed it and the related Lampteromyces in the Boletales due to the presence of the pigment variegatic acid. More specifically the genera were placed in the family Paxillaceae. However, it was found that fungi of the genus Omphalotus break down lignin while those of the genus Paxillus break down cellulose.

Since then, the genera have been found to have a close relationship with the genus Nothopanus, and the whole group to lie within the agaric family Marasmiaceae. The group has been classified in their own family Omphalotaceae.

The type species is the jack-o'-lantern mushroom (Omphalotus olearius) from Europe. Another eight species have been described. The seven species examined genetically form two clades. One is an illudens clade containing (O. illudens) of Europe and North America, and (O. mexicanus) from Central America. The other is an olearius clade containing O. olearius and the tsukiyotake (O. japonicus) from eastern Asia as sister species, and the western jack-o'-lantern (O. olivascens) and (O. subilludens). Since the phylogeny was published, Omphalotus flagelliformis has been described from Yunnan Province in China, which is related to O. mexicanus and O. illudens.

The generic name Omphalotus is derived from the Byzantine Greek ὀμΦαλοειδής, meaning "navel".

=== Phylogeny ===
- - - - - O. olearius
        - - - O. olivascens var. olivascens
            - O. olivascens var. indigo
          - O. nidiformis
      - O. japonicus
    - O. subilludens
  - O. illudens
  - O. mexicanus

Phylogeny and relationships of Omphalotus species based on ITS ribosomal DNA sequences.

=== Species ===
Image	Name	Year	Common name	Distribution
	Omphalotus flagelliformis Zhu L. Yang & B. Feng	2013		Yunnan Province in Southwestern China
	Omphalotus illudens (Schwein.) Bresinsky & Besl	1979	Jack-O'-Lantern	Eastern North America, Europe
	Omphalotus japonicus (Kawam.) Kirchm. & O.K.Mill.	2002	Tsukiyotake (月夜茸) / Moon-night mushroom	Korea, China, Japan, and far Eastern Russia.
	Omphalotus lutescens Raithelh.	1988		
	Omphalotus mangensis (Jian Z.Li & X.W.Hu) Kirchm. & O.K.Mill.	2002		China
	Omphalotus mexicanus Guzmán & V. Mora	1984		Mexico
	Omphalotus nidiformis(Berk.) O.K. Mill.	1994	Ghost fungus / Australian glow fungus	Southern Australia, India (Kerala)
	Omphalotus olearius (DC.) Singer	1984	Jack-O'-Lantern	Europe, US
	Omphalotus olivascens H.E. Bigelow, O.K. Mill. & Thiers	1976	Western Jack-O'-Lantern	California and Mexico
	Omphalotus subilludens (Murrill) H.E. Bigelow	1982	Southern Jack-O'-Lantern	South / Eastern United States

== Description ==
Fungi of this genus produce fleshy mushrooms with smooth or fibrous caps with gills and fleshy or fibrous stems growing in clumps on wood. O. mexicanus has dark blue fruiting bodies tinted with yellow.

== Toxicity ==
Many members of the genus are known to be toxic, with consumption leading to gastrointestinal symptoms of nausea, vomiting and at times diarrhea. The toxic ingredient is a sesquiterpene compound known as illudin S.

== Distribution and ecology ==
The genus has a cosmopolitan distribution, found in forests around the world. Its species cause a white soft rot on dead wood as they break down lignin.

== See also ==
- List of bioluminescent fungi
