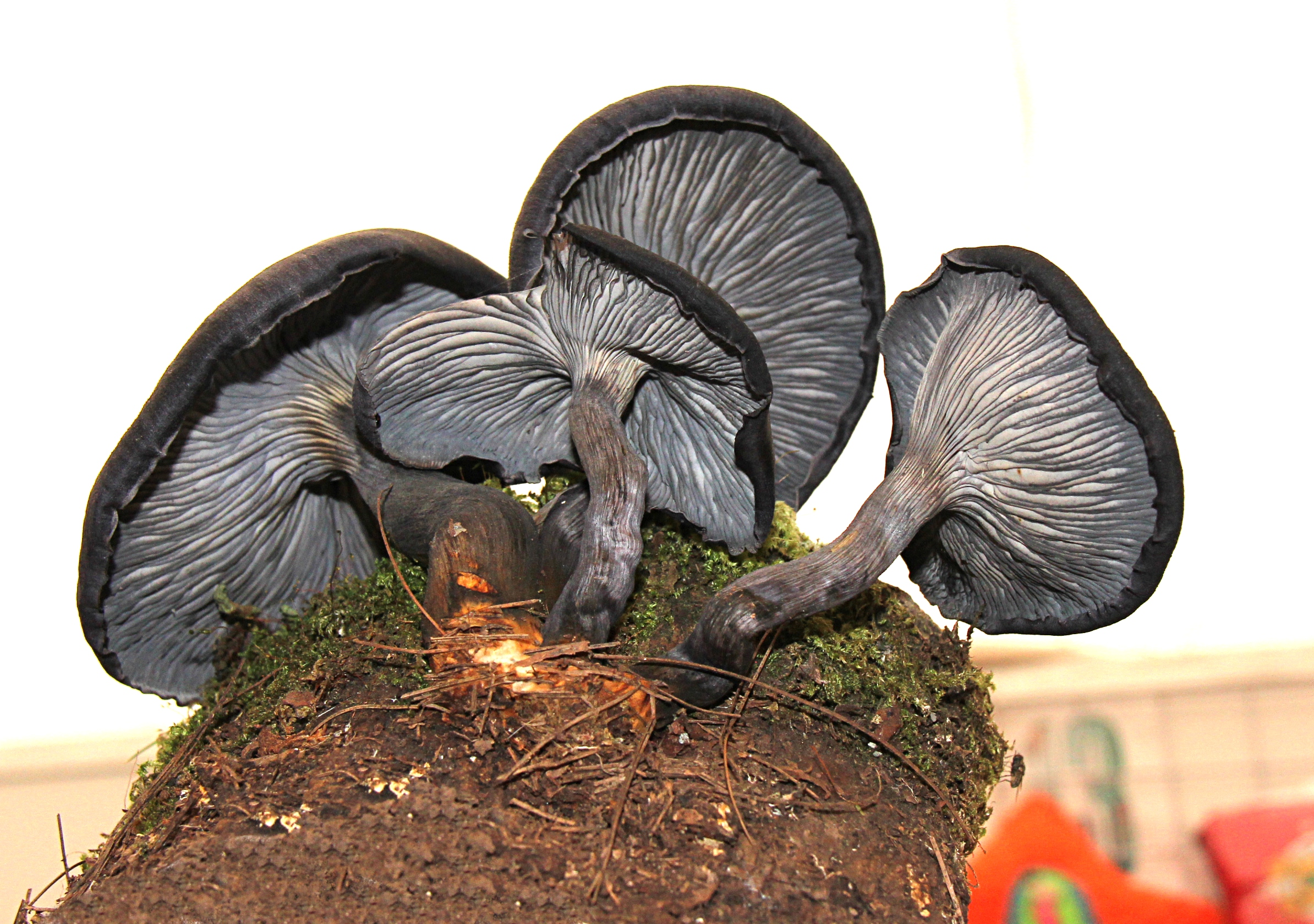

Scientific classification
- Domain: Eukaryota
- Kingdom: Fungi
- Division: Basidiomycota
- Class: Agaricomycetes
- Order: Agaricales
- Family: Omphalotaceae
- Genus: Omphalotus
- Species: O. mexicanus

Binomial name
- Omphalotus mexicanus Guzmán & V.Mora (1984)

= Omphalotus mexicanus =

Species of fungus

Omphalotus mexicanus is a gilled basidiomycete mushroom in the family Marasmiaceae. Found in Mexico, it was described as new to science in 1984. Fruit bodies contain the toxic compounds illudin S and illudin M.

Found in the highlands of Mexico and Central America, its fruiting bodies are an unusual dark blue tinted with yellow.
