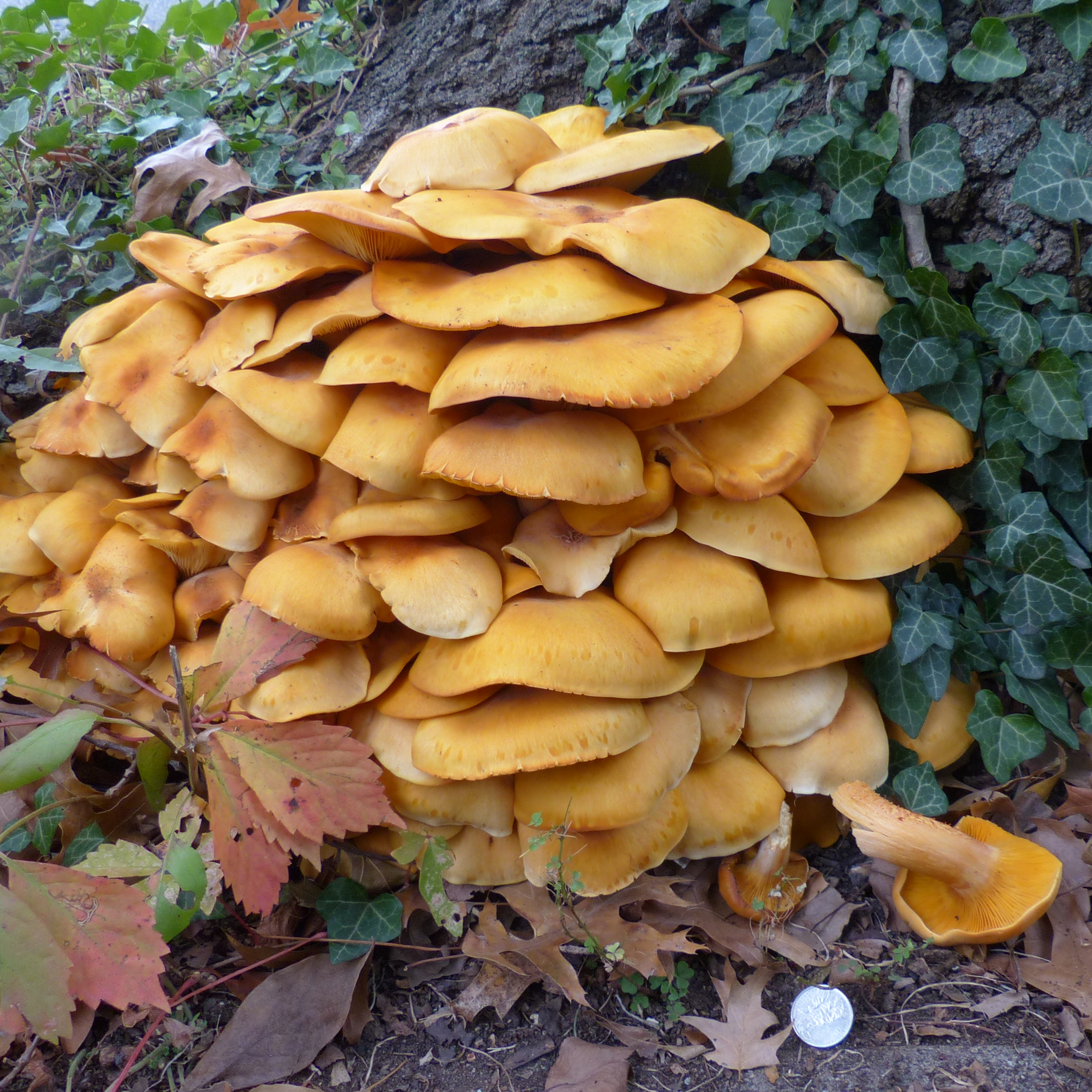

Scientific classification
- Kingdom: Fungi
- Division: Basidiomycota
- Class: Agaricomycetes
- Order: Agaricales
- Family: Omphalotaceae
- Genus: Omphalotus
- Species: O. illudens

Binomial name
- Omphalotus illudens (Schwein.) Bresinsky & Besl

= Omphalotus illudens =

Species of fungus

Omphalotus illudens
- Mycological characteristics
- Gills on hymenium
- Cap is infundibuliform
- Hymenium is decurrent
- Stipe is bare
- Spore print is yellow
- Ecology is saprotrophic
- Edibility is poisonous

Omphalotus illudens, commonly known as the eastern jack-o'lantern mushroom, is a North American species of fungus.

== Description ==
It forms a large, orange mushroom. The caps grow up to 15 centimetres (6 in) wide. The gills are decurrent and the stem is up to 15 cm long. The flesh is orange and the spore print is white to cream.

Its gills often exhibit a weak green bioluminescence when fresh. This green glow has been mentioned in several journal articles, which state that the phenomenon can persist up to 40–50 hours after the mushroom has been picked. It is believed that this display serves to attract insects to the mushroom's gills at night, which can then distribute its spores across a wider area.

=== Similar species ===
Omphalotus illudens is replaced by O. subilludens on the Gulf Coast, and O. olivascens is found in California. Desarmillaria tabescens forms small, dull orange caps.

Omphalotus illudens is sometimes confused with edible chanterelles, but can be distinguished by its thicker, fleshier appearance, tendency to form large clusters, and clearly separated caps when young. Unlike chanterelles, O. illudens is poisonous to humans when eaten, whether raw or cooked. Although some older literature claims the name is synonymous with O. olearius, phylogenetic analysis confirms the two as distinct species.

== Distribution and ecology ==
Omphalotus illudens is often found in clumps on decaying stumps, buried roots, or at the base of hardwood trees in eastern North America (June–November).

This species has been recorded – often still under O.olearius – as the main food of adults and larvae of the pleasing fungus beetle Tritoma unicolor, as well as suitable larval food of the related T.atriventris and T.erythrocephala (which may be conspecific).

== Toxicity ==
The poisonous chemical compounds illudin S and illudin M were isolated from O. illudens. In addition to their antibacterial and antifungal effects, illudins appear to be the cause of human toxicity when these mushrooms are eaten raw or cooked, causing vomiting, cramps, and diarrhea. Muscarine has also been indirectly implicated in toxicity, but modern studies to demonstrate its presence in O. illudens are needed.

The cytotoxic effect of illudin is of interest for treating some cancers, but illudin itself is too poisonous to use directly so it must first be chemically modified. Inside human cells, illudin S reacts with DNA and creates a type of DNA damage that blocks transcription. This block can only be relieved by a repair system called nucleotide excision repair. Damage in non-transcribed DNA areas is left unrepaired by the cell. This property was exploited by the company MGI Pharma to develop an illudin-derivative called Irofulven for use as a cancer treatment. Its application is still in the experimental phase.

== Gallery ==
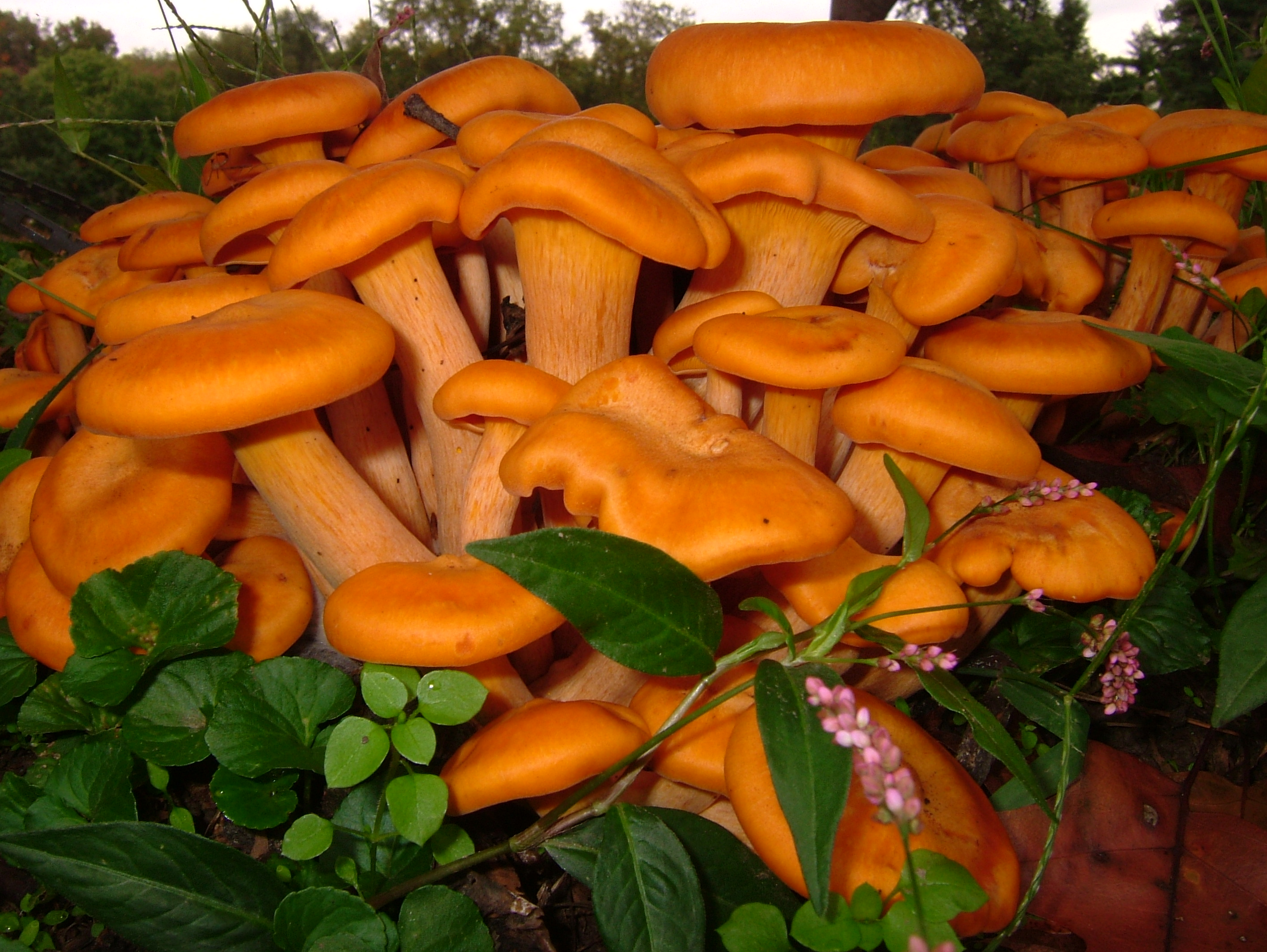
Cluster

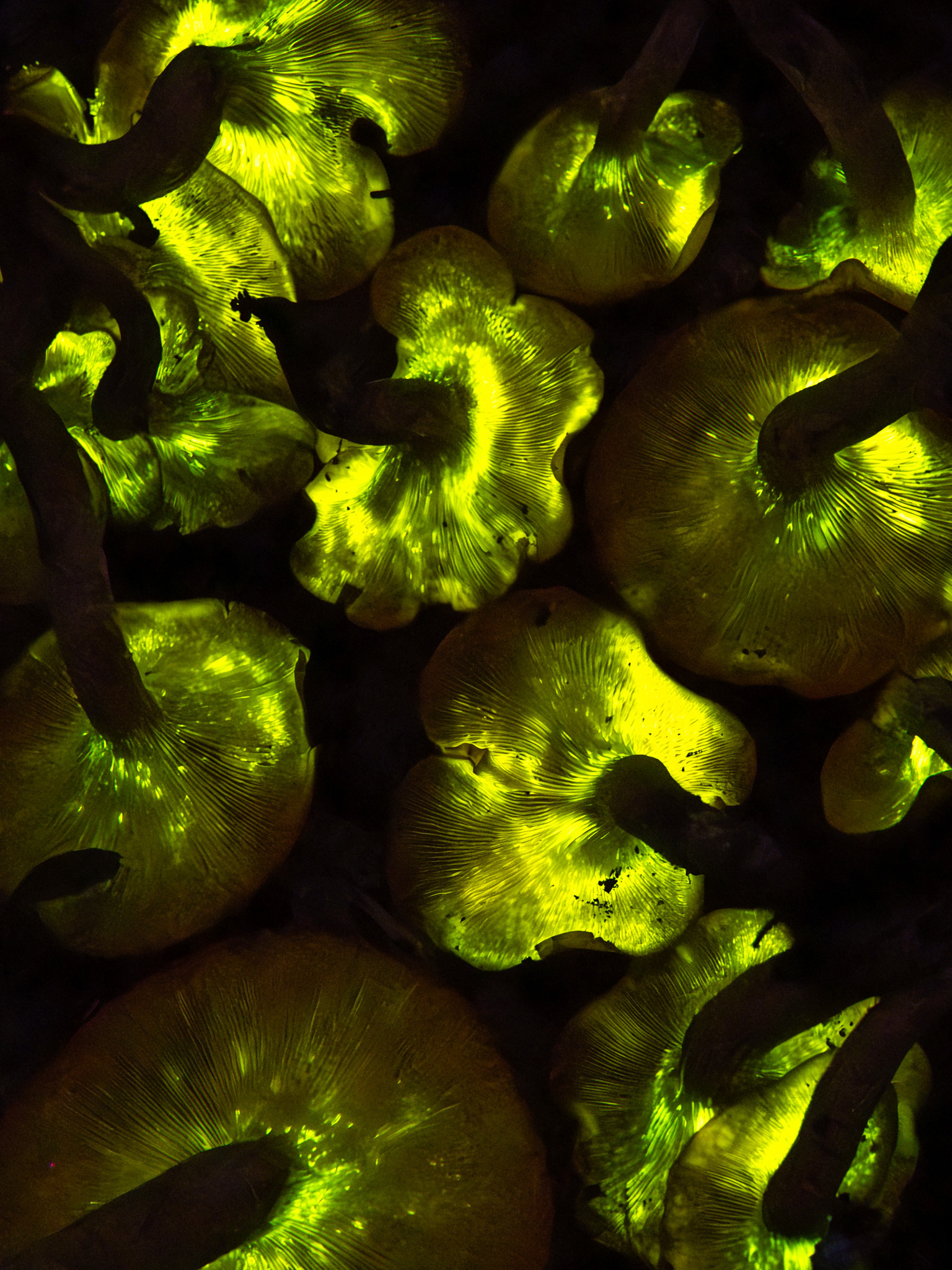
Bioluminescent gills

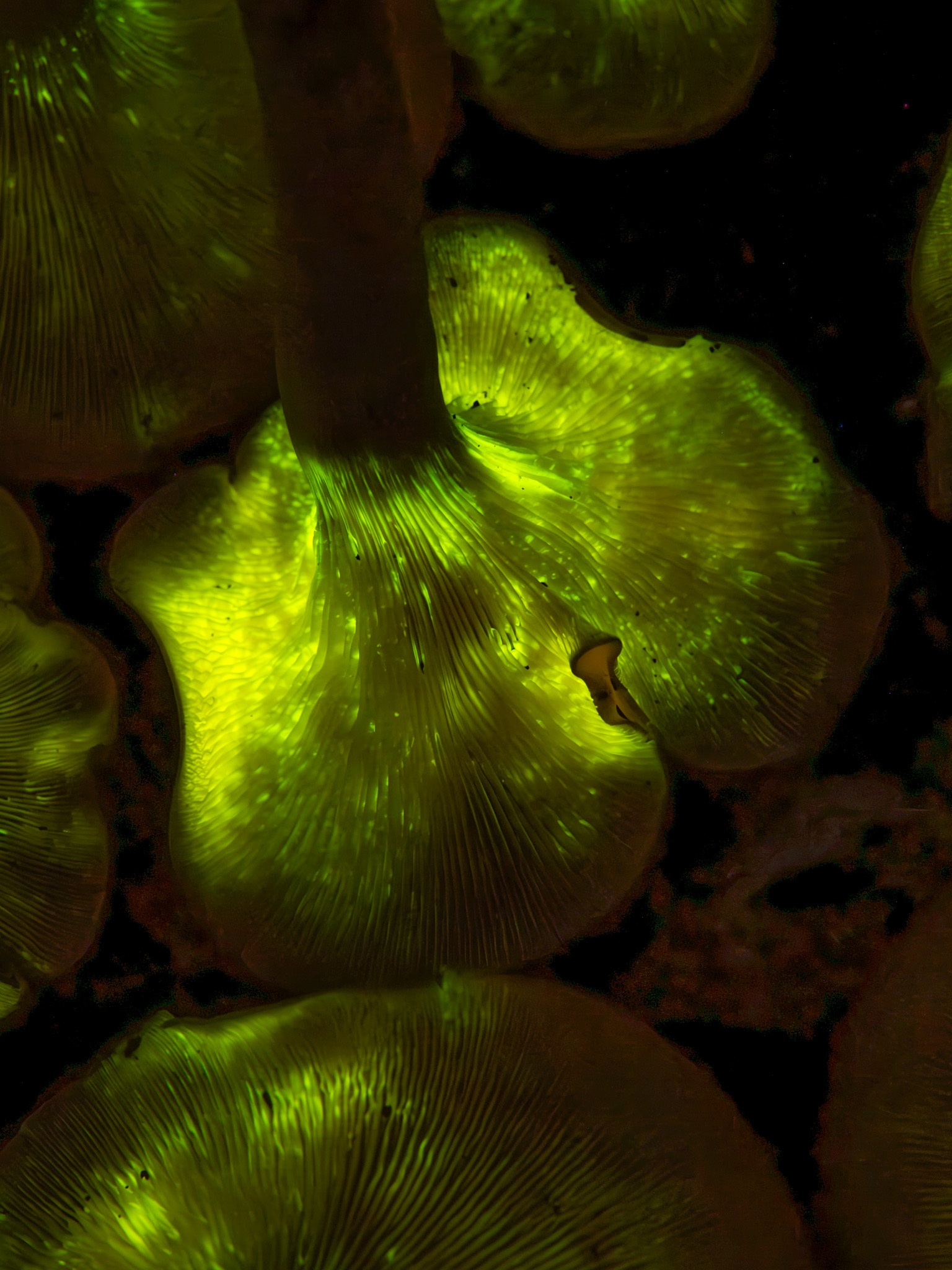
Bioluminescence close-up

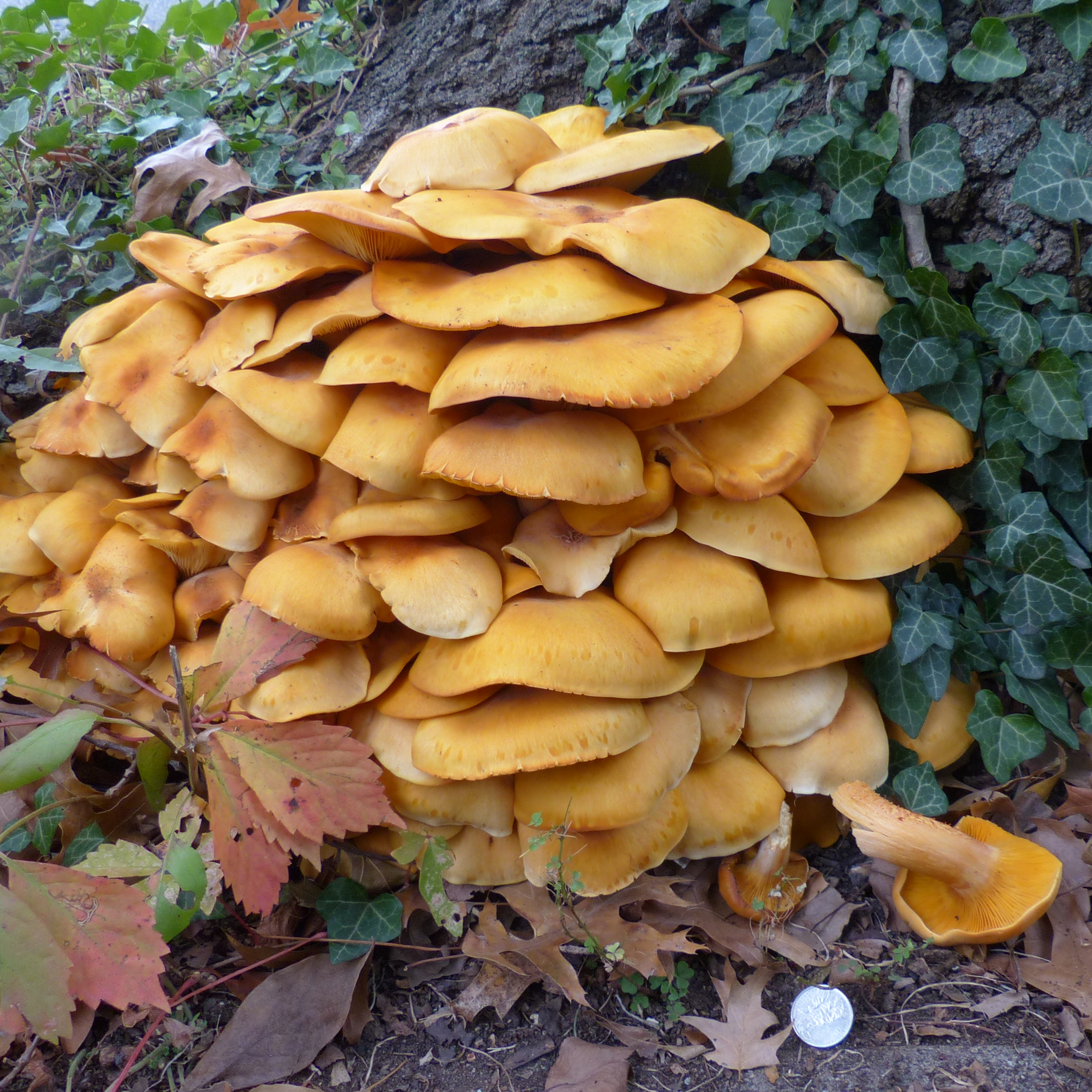
Cluster with U.S. quarter for size reference

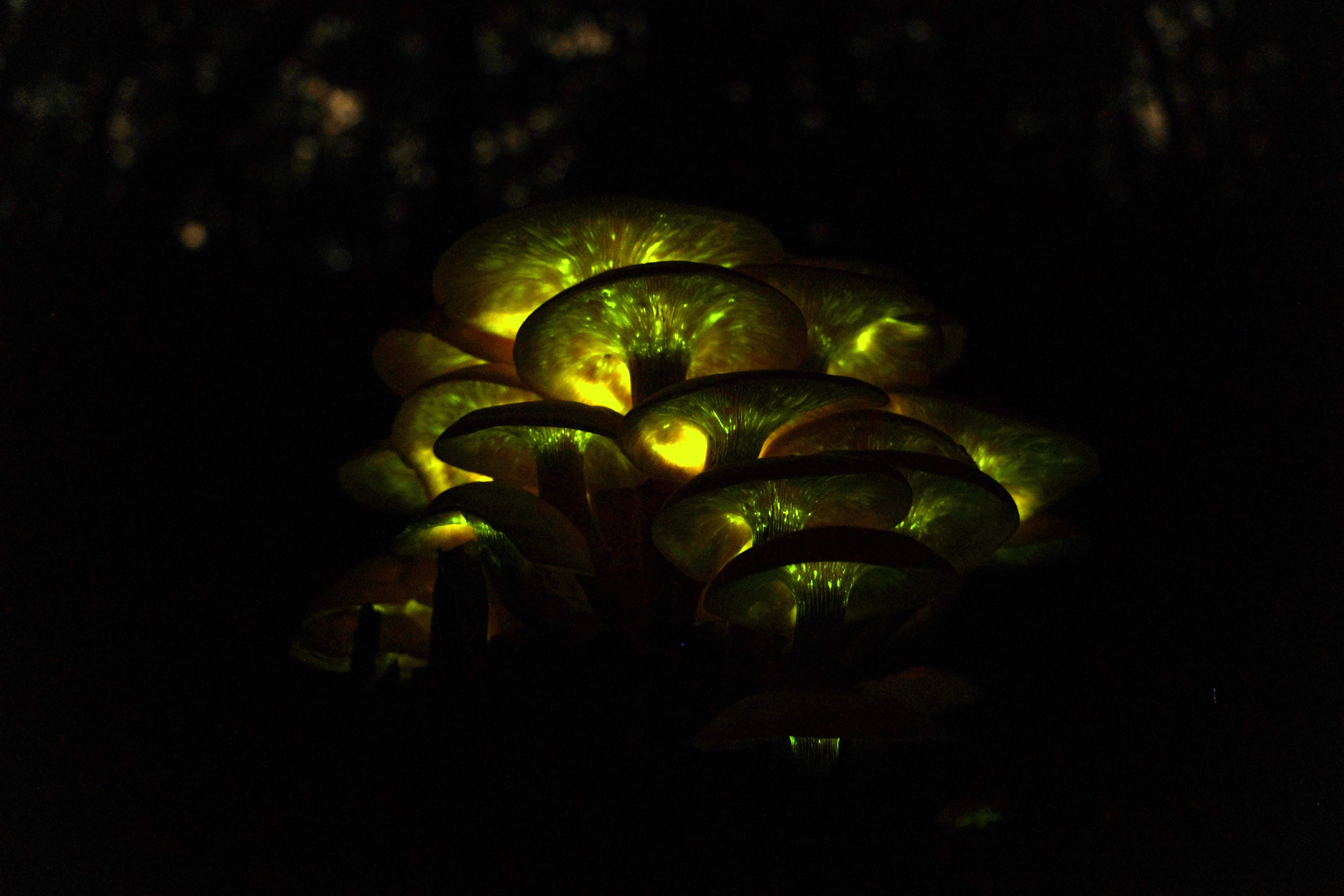
Bioluminescence

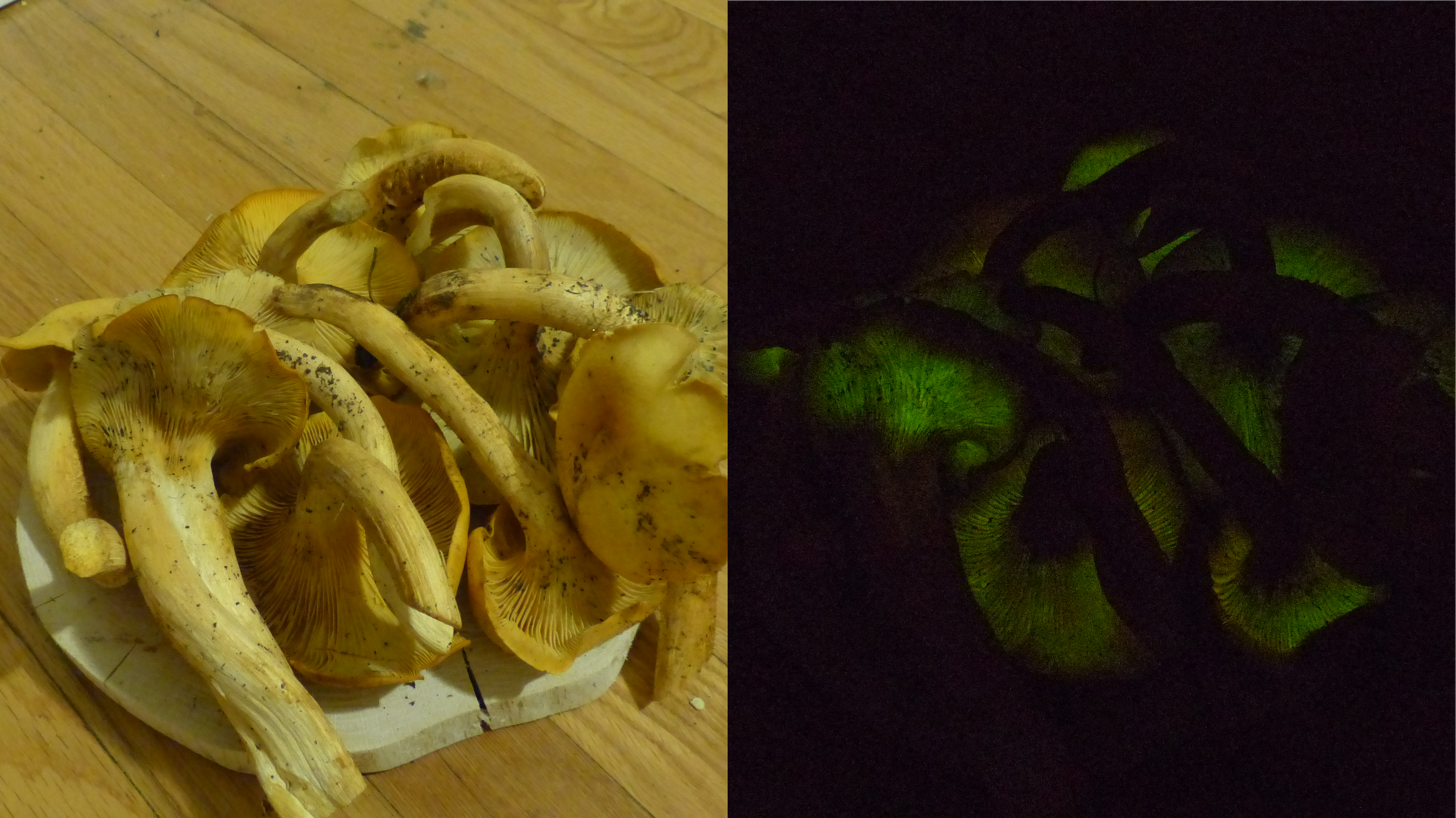
In light and darkness

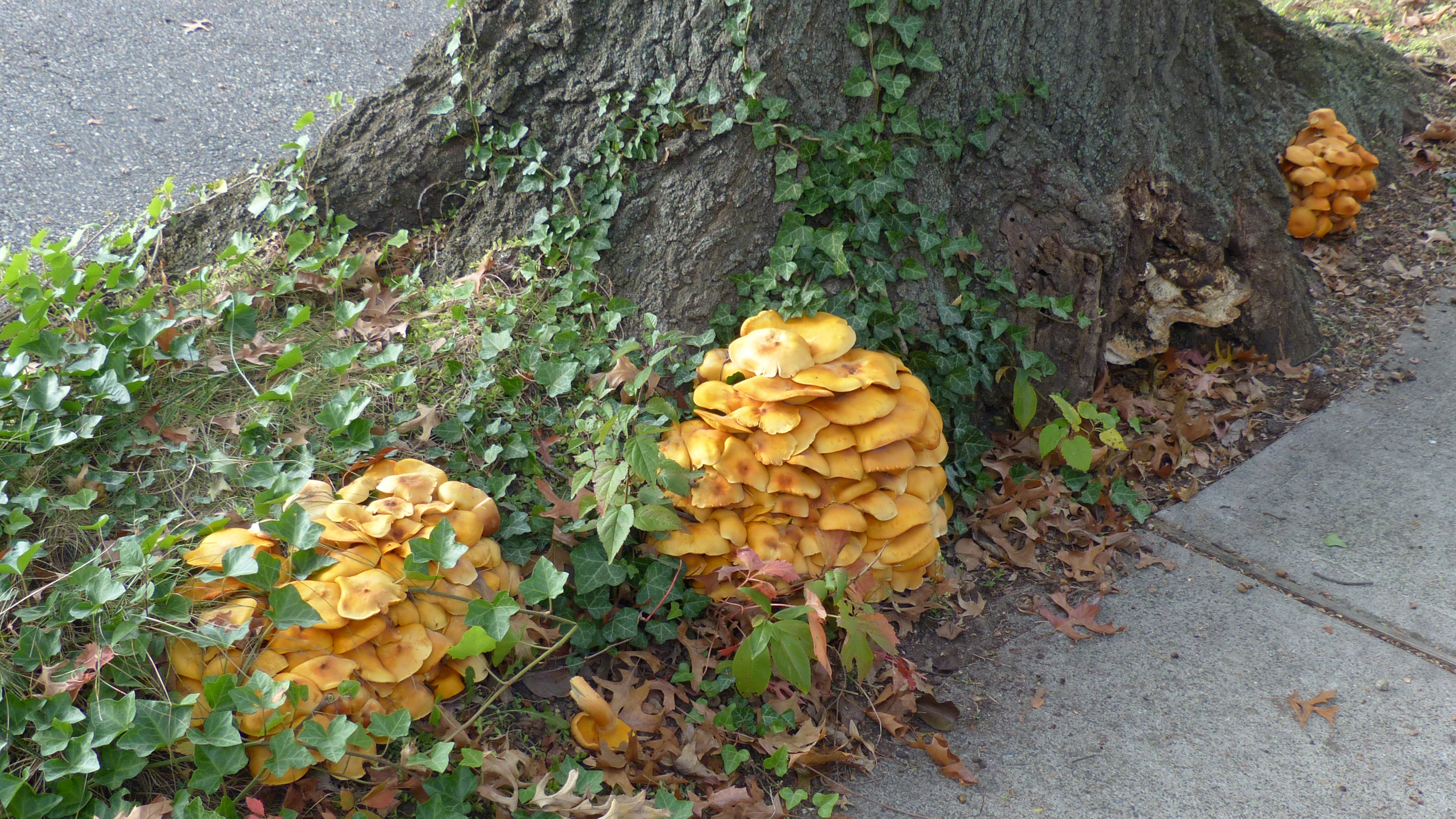
Clusters growing at the base of an oak tree

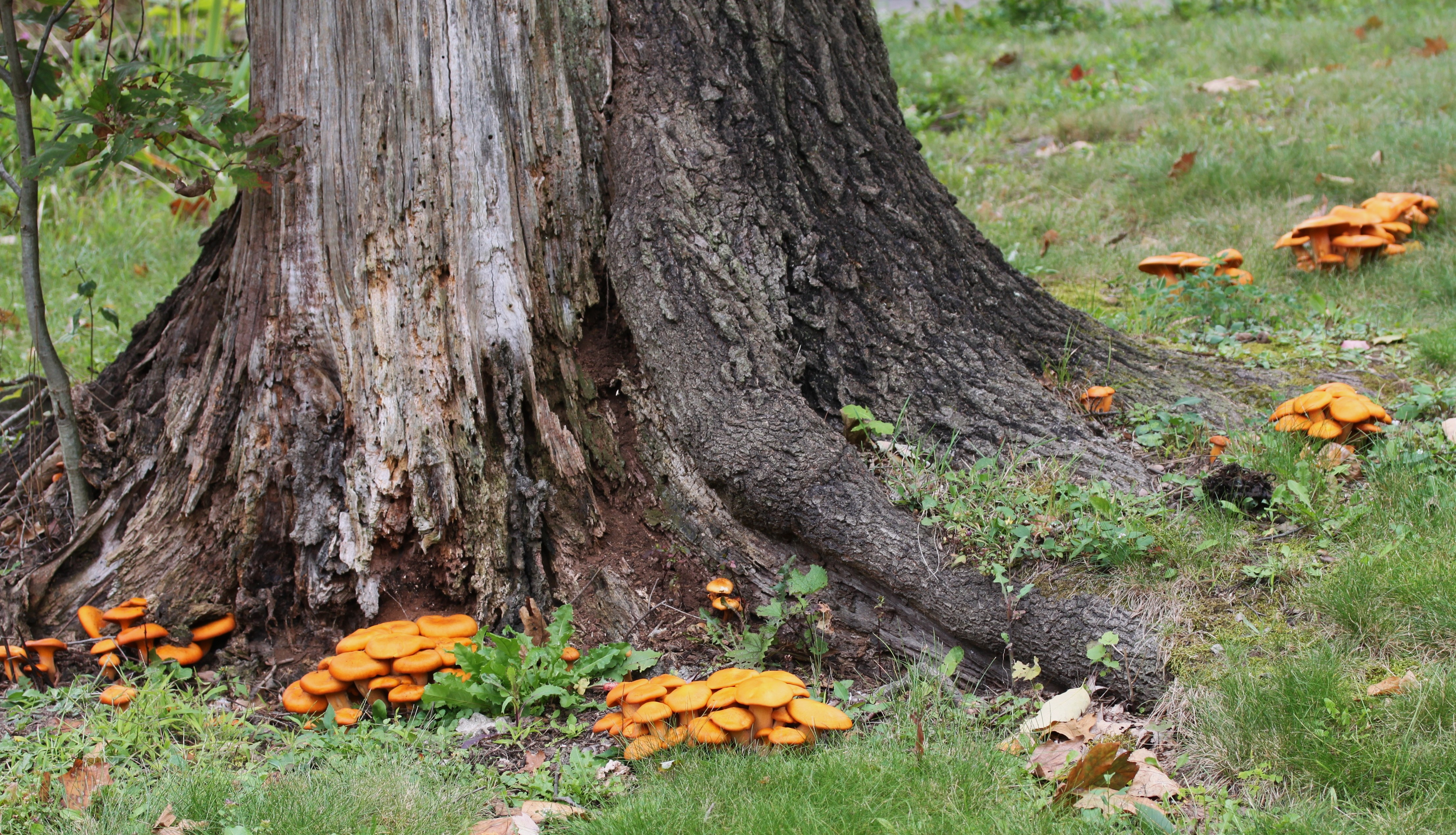
Growing near trunk

== See also ==
- List of bioluminescent fungi
