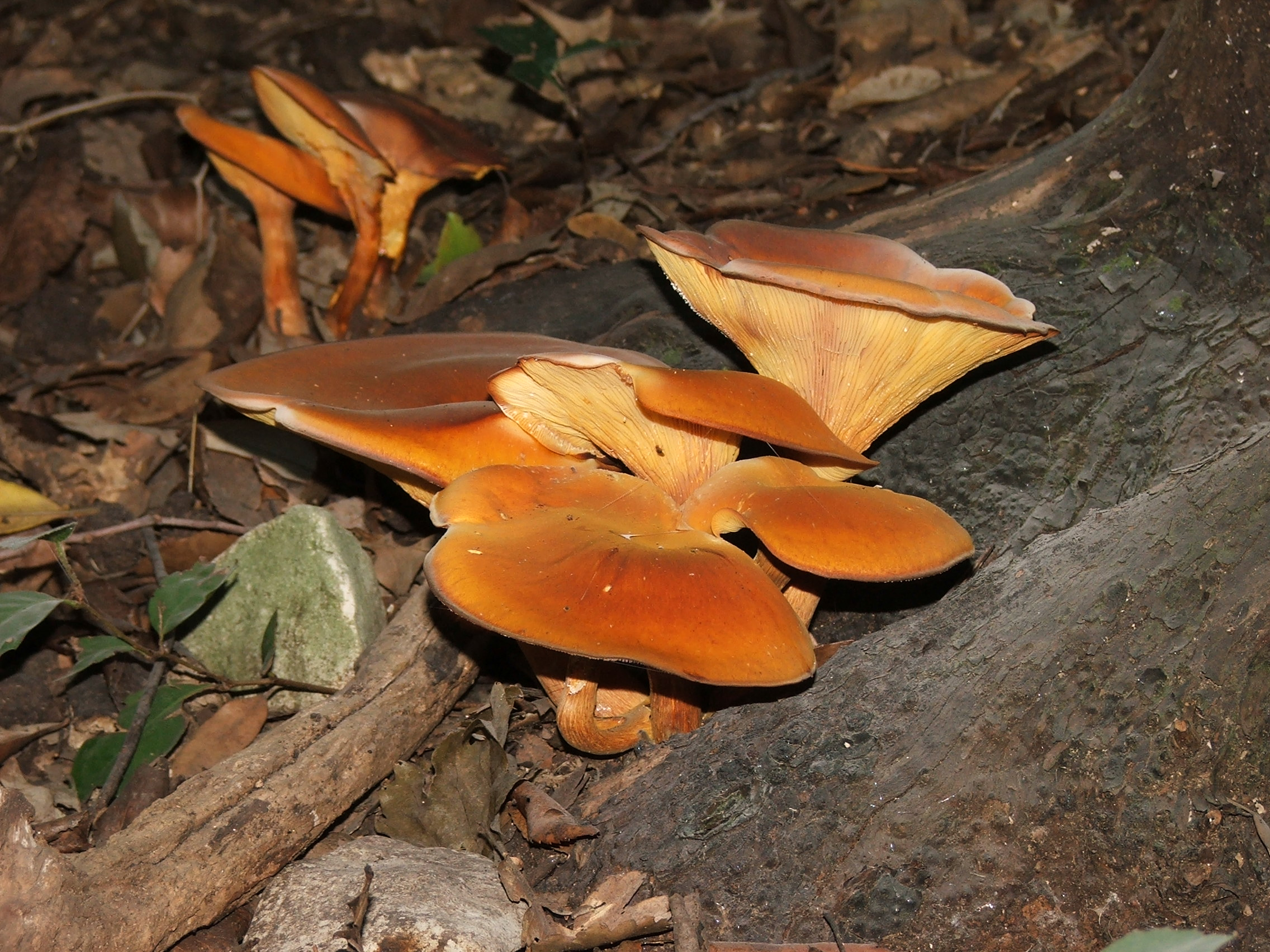

Scientific classification
- Kingdom: Fungi
- Division: Basidiomycota
- Class: Agaricomycetes
- Order: Agaricales
- Family: Omphalotaceae
- Genus: Omphalotus
- Species: O. olearius

Binomial name
- Omphalotus olearius (DC.) Sing. (1948)

Synonyms
- Agaricus olearius DC. (1815); Agaricus olearius subsp. phosphoreus Battarra ex Pers. (1828); Dryophila phosphorea (Battarra ex Pers.) Quél. (1888); Clitocybe olearia (DC.) Maire (1933); Clitocybe phosphorea (Battarra ex Pers.) Bohus (1957)

= Omphalotus olearius =

Species of fungus

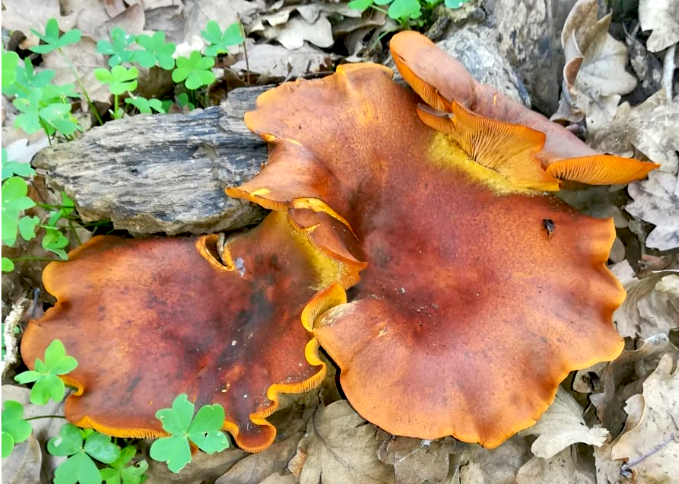
Omphalotus olearus from South Africa

Omphalotus olearius, commonly known as the jack-o'-lantern mushroom, is a poisonous orange gilled mushroom that to an untrained eye appears similar to some chanterelles. It is notable for its bioluminescent properties. It is found in woodland areas in Europe, where it grows on decaying stumps, on buried roots or at the base of hardwood trees. A similar, but phylogenetically distinct species found in eastern North America is Omphalotus illudens.

Unlike chanterelles, Omphalotus olearius and other Omphalotus species contain the toxin illudin S, and are poisonous to humans. While not typically lethal, consuming this mushroom leads to very severe cramps, vomiting, and diarrhea.

== Description ==
Omphalotus olearius is the same shade of orange internally and externally. It does not change color when bruised or sliced, a feature which helps to distinguish it from visibly similar species. Its bioluminescence, a blue-green color, can be observed in fresh specimens in low light conditions once the eye becomes dark-adapted. The whole mushroom does not glow—only the gills do so. This is due to an enzyme called luciferase, acting upon a compound called luciferin, leading to the emission of light much as fireflies do when glowing. Bioluminescence has been shown to aid in the reproduction of fungi by attracting insects to them to spread spores. However, the jack-o'-lantern mushroom does not use bioluminescence for the purpose of attracting insects, and studies on it have not yet determined the exact purpose of bioluminescence in this species.

Identifiable characteristics of the jack-o'-lantern mushroom include true, sharp, decurrent, non-forking gills. The smell of these mushrooms is non-distinctive. Cap size can range from 4–12 cm in diameter. The jack-o'-lantern stem can vary between 1–2 cm (0.39–0.79 in) in thickness and 3.5–9 cm (1.4–3.5 in) in total length from attachment to cap to base of stem.

== Distribution and habitat ==
Omphalotus olearius are an uncommon find and can be seen in the summer and fall seasons (July–October) in regions of southern Europe. This range includes southern France, the Iberian Peninsula, and other Mediterranean countries. This species has also been reported from the Western Cape Province, South Africa. Clusters of jack-o'-lantern mushrooms can be found in forests that contain primarily deciduous trees. The roots, decaying stumps, and bases of hardwoods are their preferred habitat, particularly on the decaying roots of olive trees.

Omphalotus olearius
- Mycological characteristics
- Gills on hymenium
- Cap is infundibuliform
- Hymenium is decurrent
- Stipe is bare
- Spore print is yellow
- Ecology is saprotrophic
- Edibility is poisonous

== Similar species ==
Several species of chanterelles may be confused with the jack-o'-lantern mushroom. A characteristic that distinguishes chanterelles from the jack-o'-lantern is the appearance of the gills. Jack-o'-lanterns have sharp, bendable, paper-like gills; chanterelles, however, have false gills that take the appearance of blunt ridges. Furthermore, if the jack-o'-lantern's stem is peeled, the same shade of orange as the outer flesh, while the chanterelle is paler inside the stem. The Jack-o'-lantern mushroom is also mistaken as the edible Laetiporus as they have a similar color scheme.

Two common bioluminescent species that can be found in North America are Omphalotus illudens and Omphalotus olivascens. Omphalotus olivascens is common to southern to central California, while Omphalotus illudens is found in eastern North America. Both of these species are poisonous. The similarly poisonous mushroom Tsukiyotake (Omphalotus japonicus, formerly known as Lampteromyces japonicus), can be found in Japan and eastern Asia and is also bioluminescent and contains the same poison, illudin.

== See also ==
- List of bioluminescent fungi

== Gallery ==
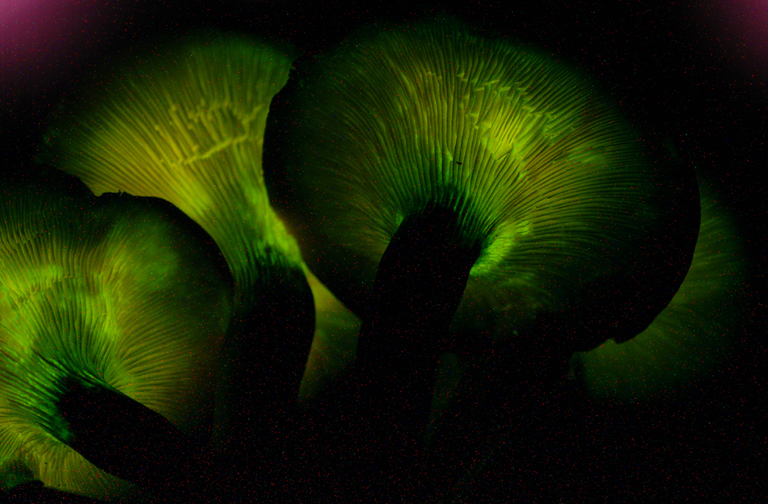
Bioluminescent gills

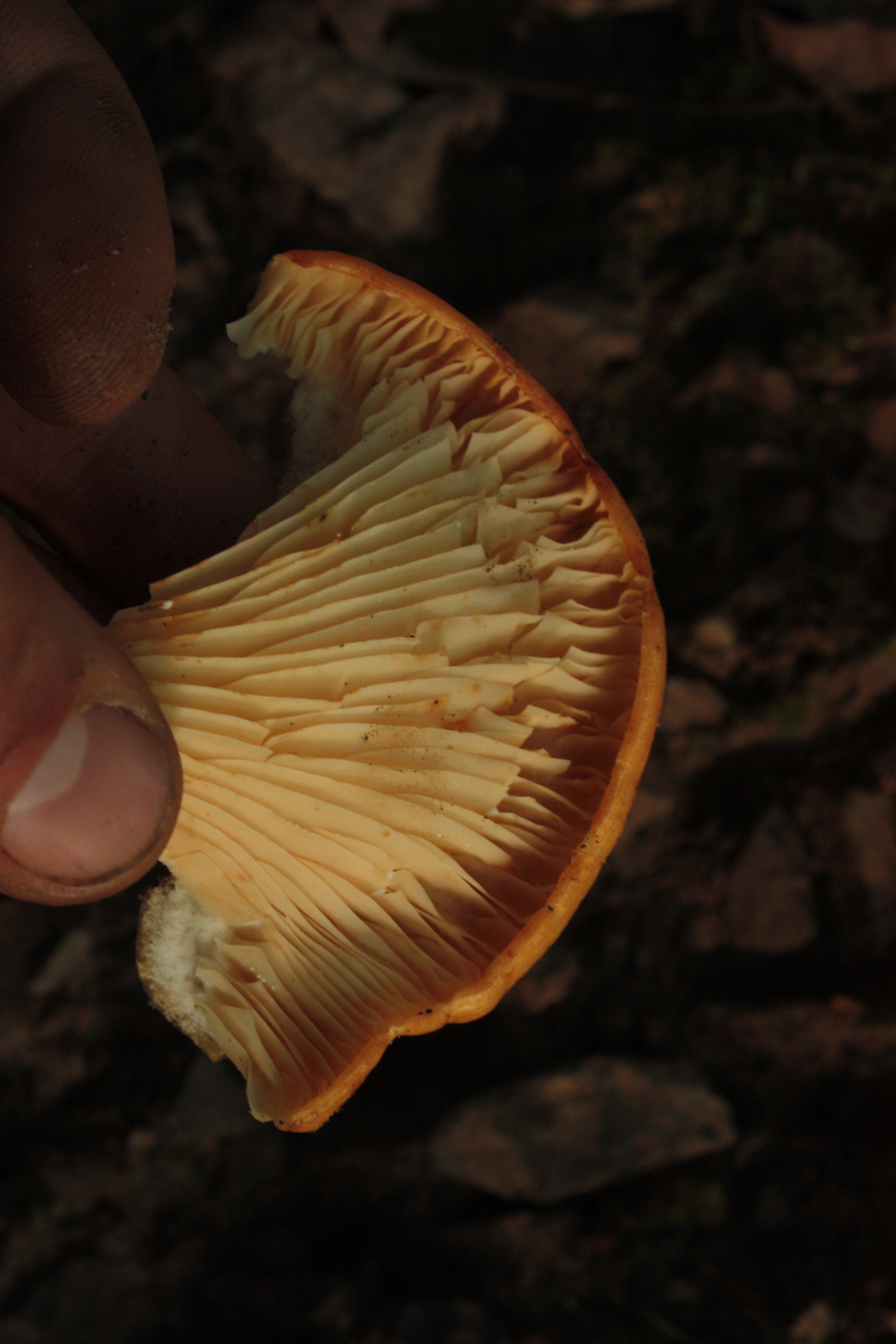
Close up of gills

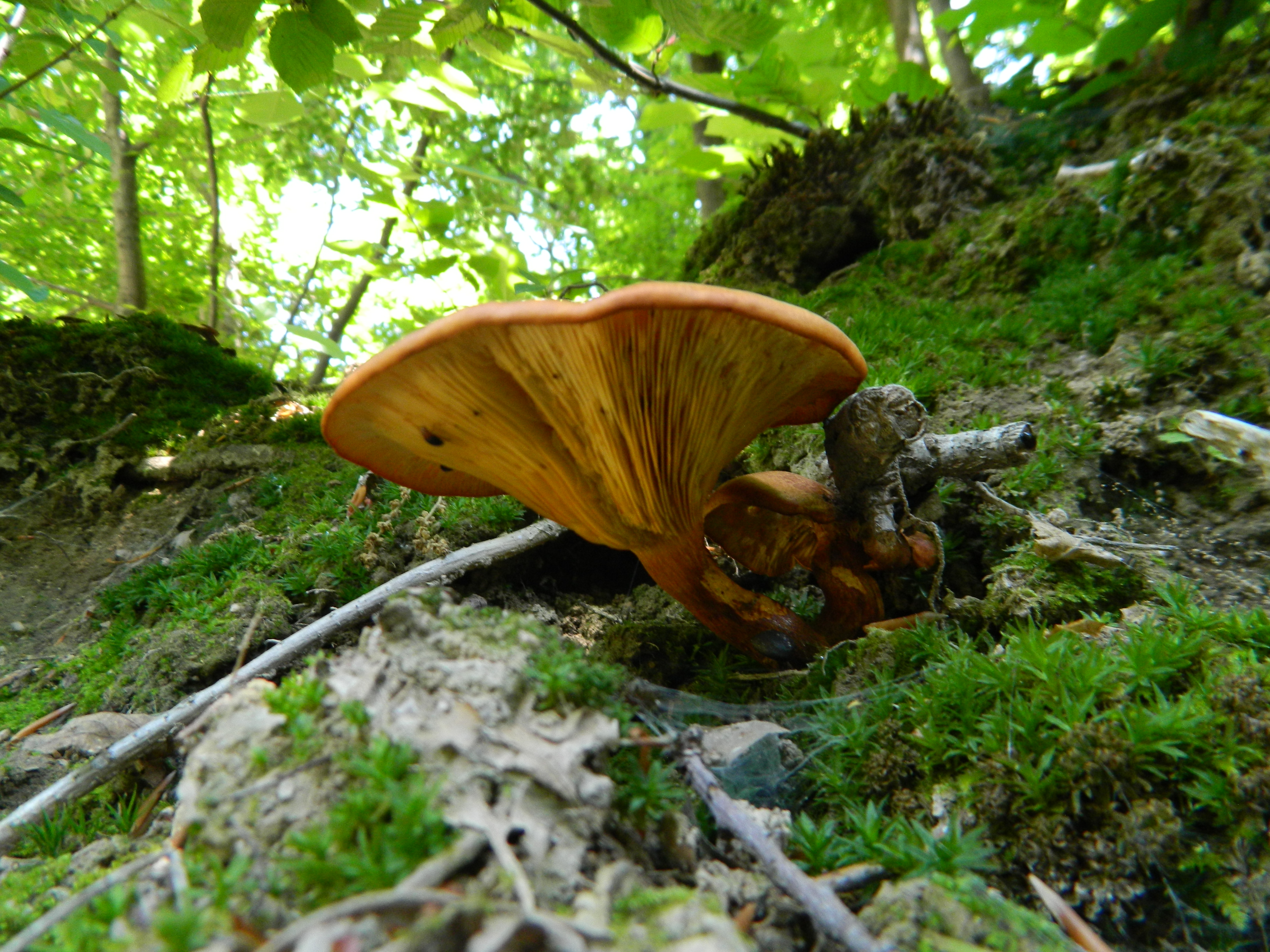

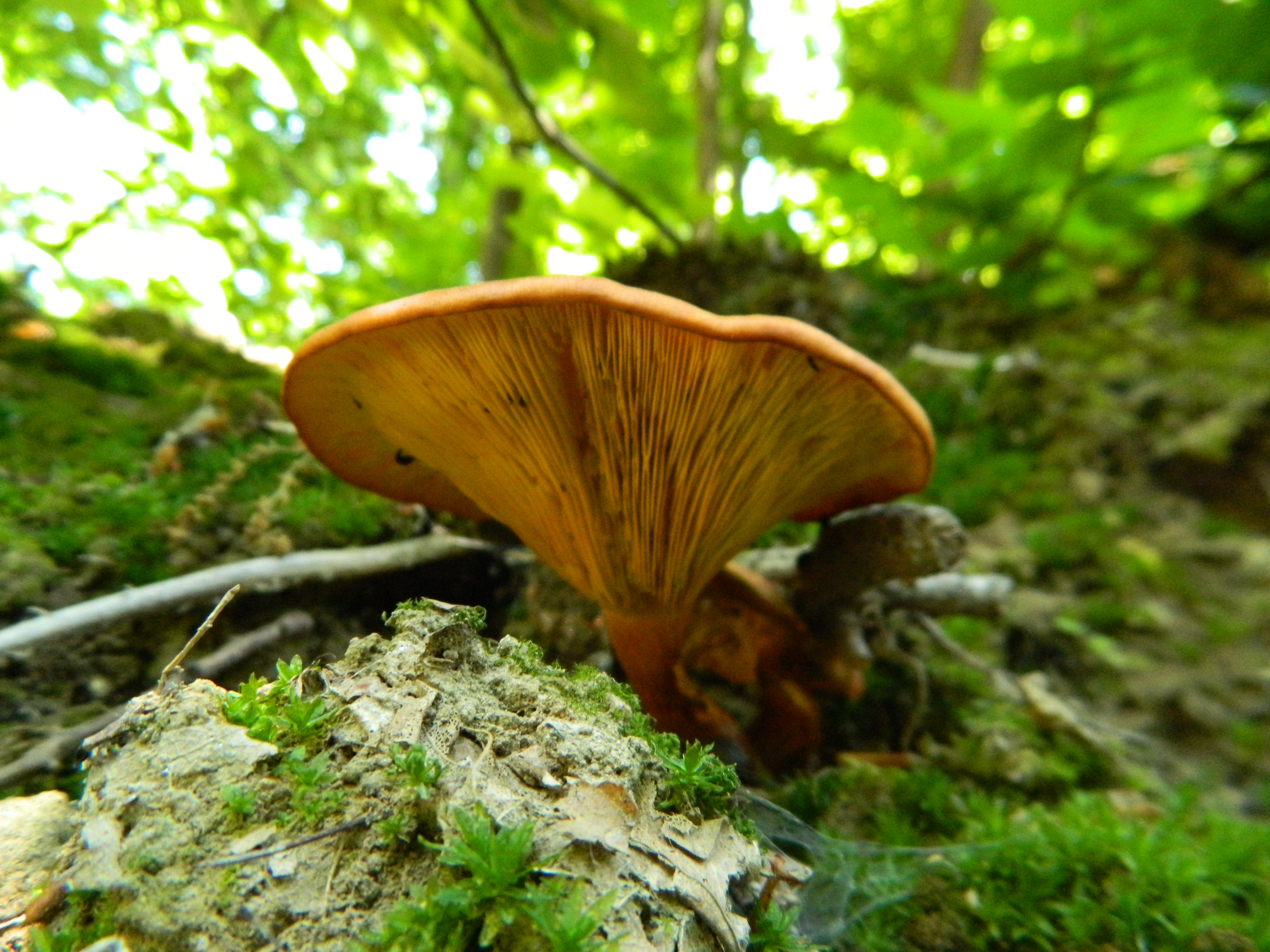

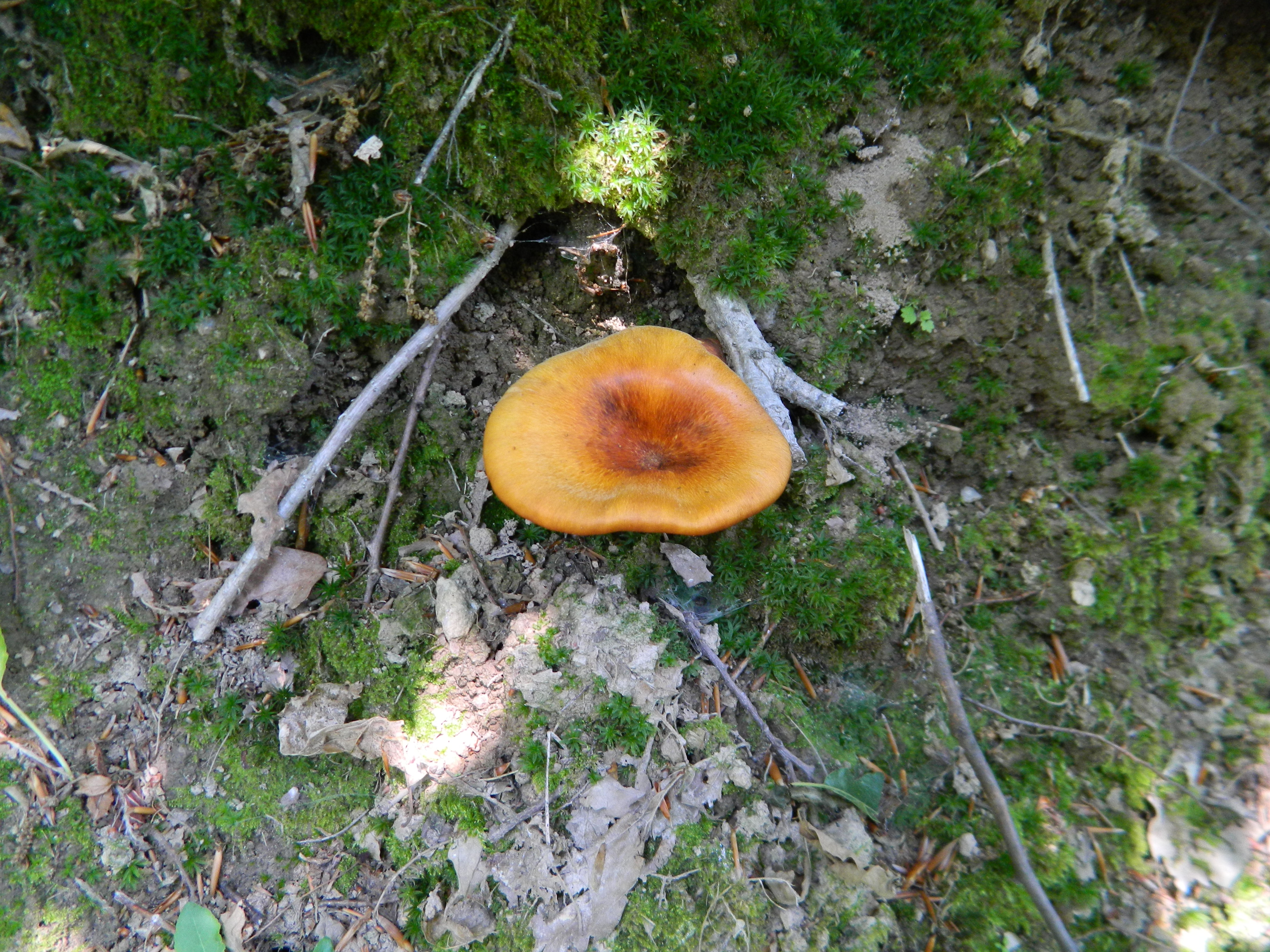

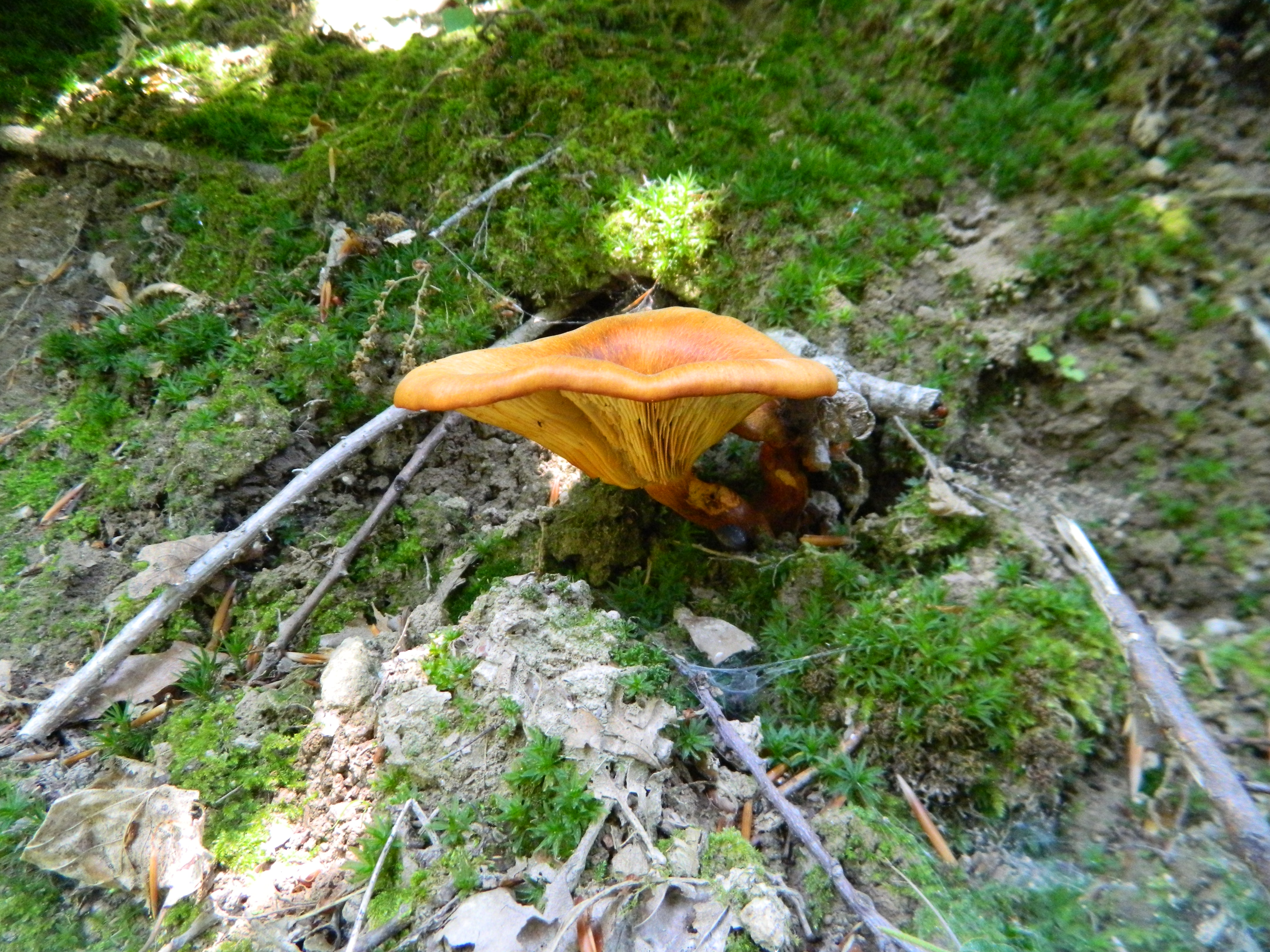

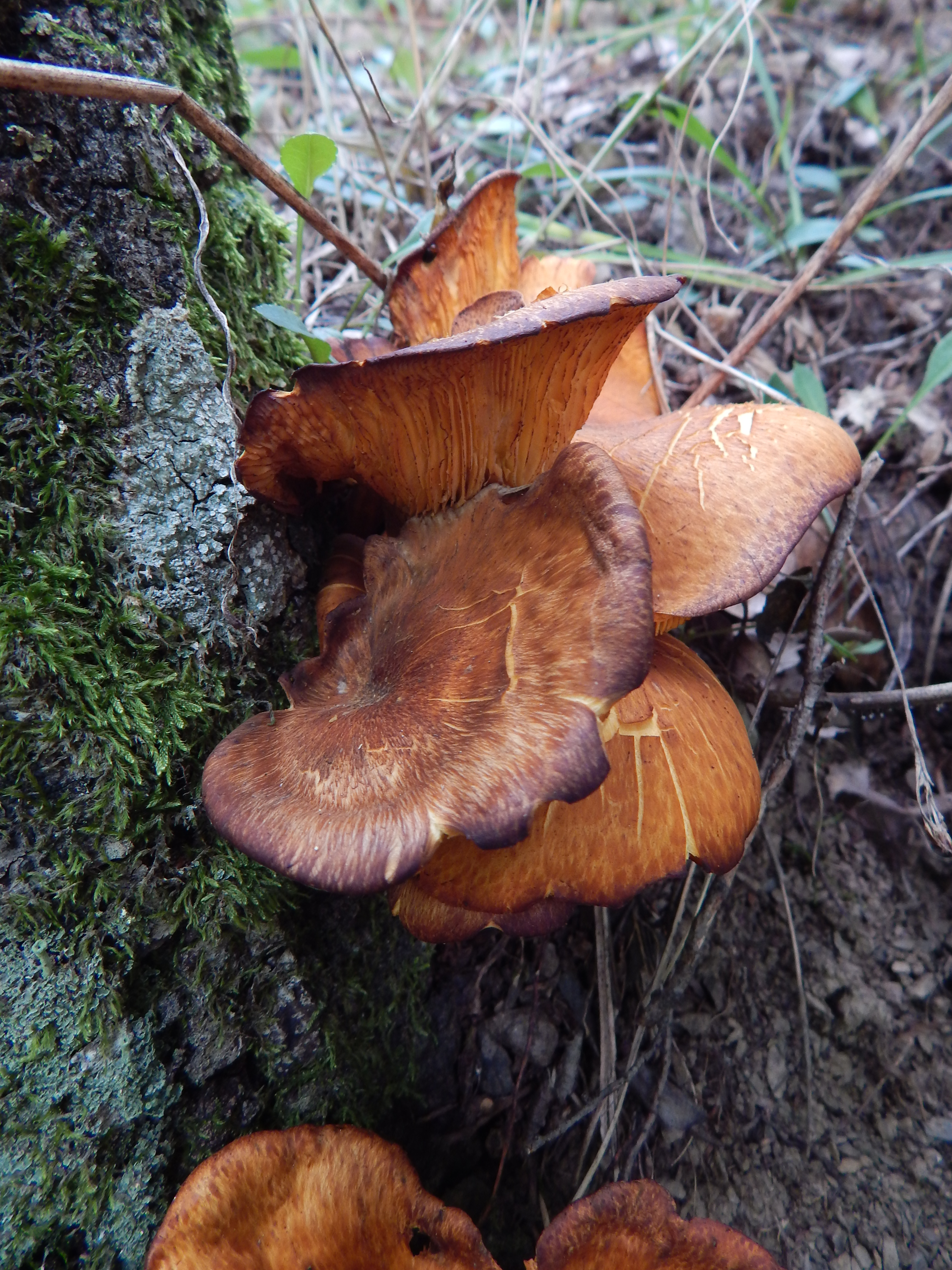
