= Illudin =

Group of chemical compounds

Skeletal formulae of isolated illudins

The illudins are a family of sesquiterpenes with antitumor antibiotic properties produced by some mushrooms. In their isolated form, illudins show selective toxicity for myelocytic leukemia and other carcinoma cells.

Illudins are highly toxic, with little apparent therapeutic value in their natural form. Illudins are thought to be responsible for the toxicity of various Omphalotus species such as O. olearius and O. illudens (Jack o' Lantern mushrooms), and O. nidiformis (Australian ghost fungus).

Active metabolites of illudins damage DNA via an unknown mechanism. In addition, genetic analysis suggests that the illudin-mediated DNA damage is ignored by global excision repair systems unless the lesions occur within stalled replication or transcription complexes.
