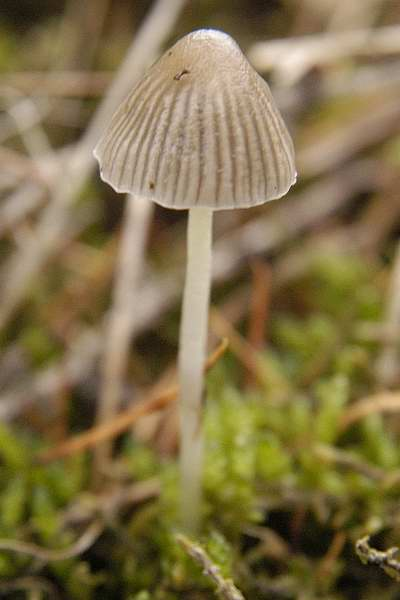

Scientific classification
- Kingdom: Fungi
- Division: Basidiomycota
- Class: Agaricomycetes
- Order: Agaricales
- Family: Mycenaceae
- Genus: Mycena
- Species: M. leptocephala

Binomial name
- Mycena leptocephala (Pers.) Gillet

Synonyms
- Agaricus leptocephalus Pers. (1800); Agaricus alcalinus subsp. leptocephalus (Pers.) Pers. (1821); Mycena alcalina var. chlorinella J.E.Lange (1914); Mycena chlorinella (J.E.Lange) Singer (1936)

= Mycena leptocephala =

Species of fungus

Mycena leptocephala
- Mycological characteristics
- Gills on hymenium
- Cap is conical
- Hymenium is adnate
- Stipe is bare
- Spore print is white
- Ecology is saprotrophic
- Edibility is unknown

Mycena leptocephala, commonly known as the nitrous bonnet, is a species of fungus in the family Mycenaceae. The mushrooms have conical grayish caps that reach up to 3 cm (1.2 in) in diameter, and thin fragile stems up to 5 cm (2.0 in) long. The gills are gray and distantly spaced. The spores are elliptical, typically measure 7–10 by 4–6 μm, and are white in deposit. When viewed under a light microscope, the gills have abundant spindle-shaped cystidia on the gill edges, but few on the gill faces. Similar species include Mycena alcalina, M. austera, and M. brevipes.

The mushroom is found in North America, Asia, and Europe where it grows singly or in groups on conifer needles, cones and sticks on the forest floor. It has a distinctive odor of bleach; the edibility is unknown.

== Taxonomy ==
The species was first called Agaricus leptocephalus by Christian Hendrik Persoon in 1800, and was transferred to the genus Mycena in 1876 by French mycologist Claude-Casimir Gillet. Synonyms include Agaricus alcalinus var. leptocephalus (Fries, 1821), Mycena alcaline var. chlorinella (J.E. Lange, 1914), and Mycena chlorinella (Singer, 1936). The latter was reduced to synonym in a 1980 publication by Dutch Mycena specialist Maas Geesteranus.

Mycena leptocephala is classified in the section Fragilipedes of the genus Mycena, along with other similar-looking mushrooms, such as M. aetites, M. austera, M. parca, and M. aronsenii. Some of these have a nitrous smell similar to M. leptocephala.

=== Etymology ===
The specific epithet leptocephala is derived from the Greek λεπτος leptos, "thin" and κεφαλη kephale, "head", and refers to the delicate cap. The mushroom is commonly known as the "nitrous bonnet".

== Description ==
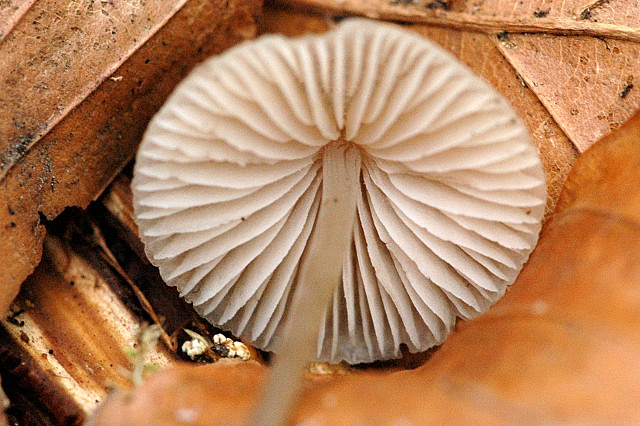
The distantly-spaced, pallid gills have an ascending-adnate attachment to the stem, and one or two tiers of interspersed lamellulae.

The cap is 1–3 cm (0.4–1.2 in) in diameter, and initially a fat conical shape with the margin pressed close to the stem. As the cap expands, it becomes broadly conic to convex, sometimes broadly bell-shaped, and sometimes convex with a flaring margin. The cap surface has a whitish sheen because of its pruinose coating. The coating gradually sloughs off, leaving the surface smooth and moist. The cap shows radial grooves that outline the position of the gills underneath. Its color is initially dusky brownish-gray to blackish (after the pruinose coating has sloughed off), soon fading from dark to light gray and finally ashy-gray. The flesh is thin and fragile, grayish, and has a slightly sour (acidulous) taste, and a weakly alkaline odor that strengthens in intensity if the flesh is crushed. Its edibility is unknown, but it is too small to be of interest.

The gills are narrow, equal in width throughout, ascending-adnate (the gills attach at much less than a right angle, appearing to curve upward toward stem) and toothed. They are subdistantly spaced, with 18–27 gills reaching the stem, and one or two tiers of lamellulae (short gills that do not extend fully from the cap edge to the stem) interspersed between them. The color of the gills is pallid or cinereous, with pallid and even edges.

The stem is 3–8 cm (1–3 in) long, 1–2 mm thick, equal in width throughout, hollow, and very fragile. It is usually bluish-black initially (darker than the cap) but gradually turns sordid brownish-gray, and finally fades to pallid or cinereous. The surface is densely white-pruinose overall, but soon polished and translucent when the pruinose coating wears off. The stem base is nearly smooth to rather densely white-strigose. The species has a distinctive bleach-like odor. The spore print is white.

=== Microscopic characteristics ===
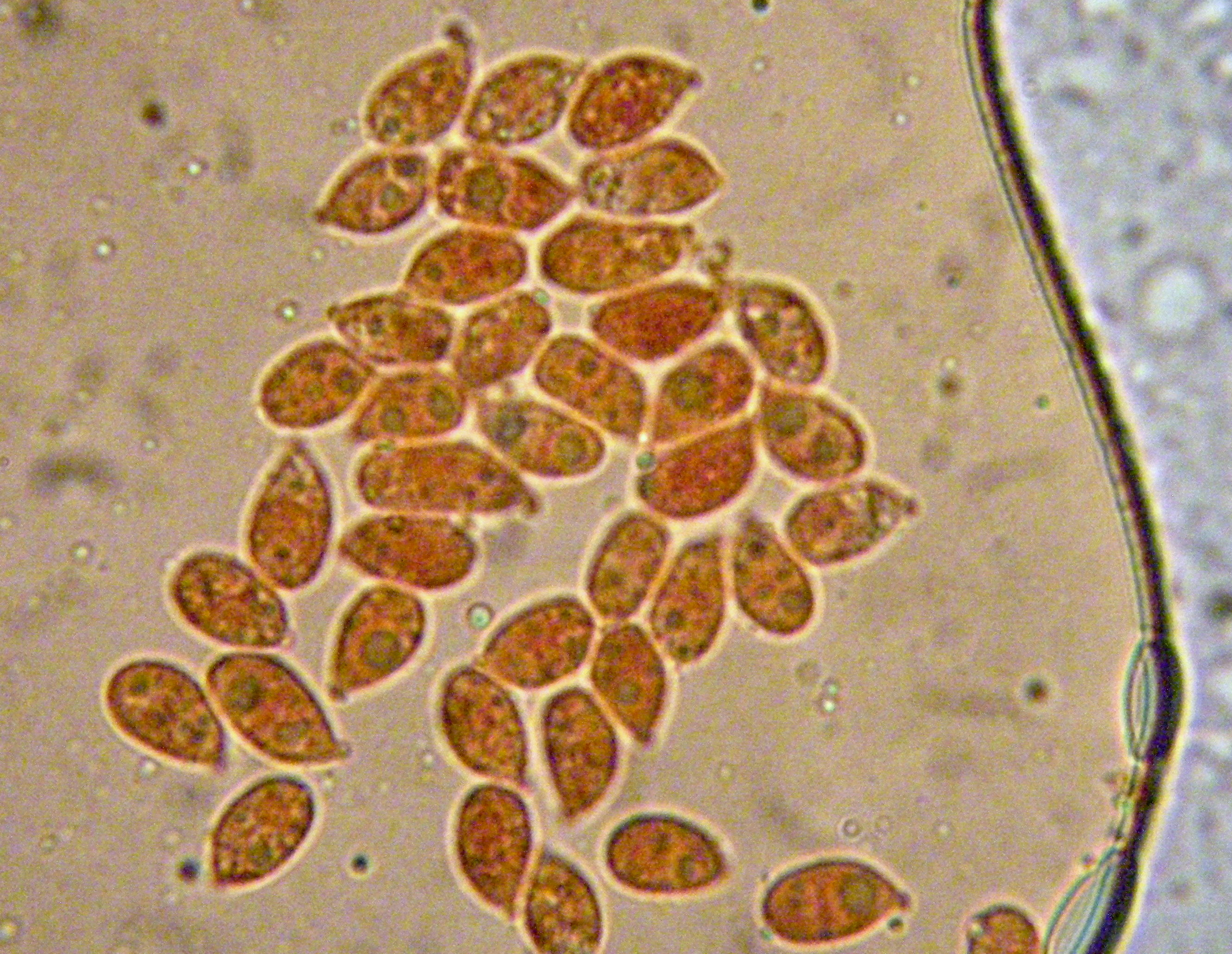
The spores are broadly ellipsoid.

The spores are broadly ellipsoid, amyloid (meaning they will adsorb iodine when stained with Melzer's reagent), and measure 7–10 by 4–6 μm. The basidia (the spore-bearing cells) are usually four-spored, although two- and three-spored forms have been found on which the spores measure 11–14 by 6–6.5 μm or 8–10 by 3.5–4.5 μm, respectively. The pleurocystidia (cystidia on the face of a gill) are scattered, rare or absent, 30–44 by 9–13 μm, variable in shape, fusoid-ventricose to club-shaped, with some having a forked apex. The pleurocystidia that are club-shaped occasionally have two or three finger-like prolongations. The cheilocystidia (cystidia on the gill edge) are numerous, and similar in morphology to the pleurocystidia. The flesh of the gill is homogenous, composed of enlarged hyphae that stain vinaceous-brown in iodine. The flesh of the cap has a well-differentiated pellicle, the cells of which bear numerous rodlike prolongations. The hypoderm (a layer of tissue immediately below the pellicle) is well-formed, while the remaining tissue is floccose; all but the pellicle are vinaceous-brown in iodine stain.

=== Similar species ===
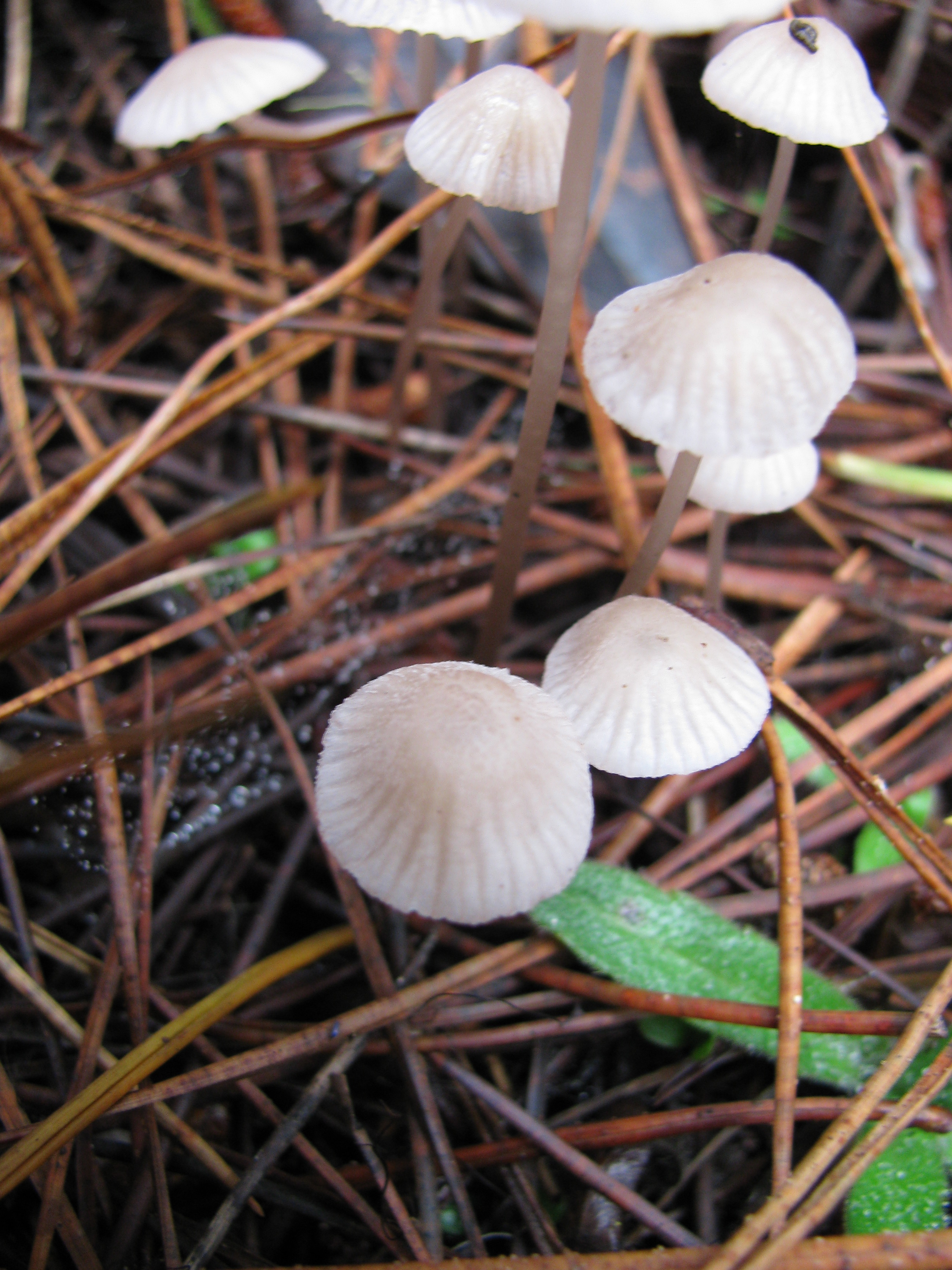
M. alcalina is a lookalike species.

The "stump fairy helmet" Mycena alcalina is a common species that is similar in appearance and odor to M. leptocephala. However, it grows on conifer wood and rarely on the ground. Microscopically, it has numerous cystidia on the gill edges. Although M. leptocephala usually has a weaker alkaline odor and a more fragile stem, the strength of the odor of M. alcalina is also quite variable, so differences in odor cannot be used as the sole distinguishing characteristic. M. austera, described from southern Norway in 1994, differs from M. leptocephala by the lack of a nitrous odor, and differently shaped cheilocystidia and terminal cells of the cortical layer of the stem. Alexander H. Smith considers M. brevipes close to M. leptocephala, but the former mushroom has a short stem up to 3.5 cm (1.4 in) long, typically grows singly, and lacks an odor.

Other similar species include M. stipata and M. capillaripes.

== Habitat and distribution ==
Mycena leptocephala is a saprobic species, meaning it derives nutrients from the breakdown of organic matter. Fruit bodies are found growing scattered to gregarious on fallen sticks and on needle carpets under conifers, and are rather common during early summer and again in the autumn. Fruit bodies may be infected by the bonnet mold Spinellus fusiger.

In North America, the fungus is found in Canada (British Columbia, Manitoba, Nova Scotia, Prince Edward Island), to Washington and south to California and North Carolina. In South America, the mushroom has been collected in Venezuela. It also grows in the Archipelago of the Recherche, off the southern coast of Western Australia. In Europe, it is known from Britain, Finland, The Netherlands, Norway, and Spain It has also been found in various locations in Asia: the Vindhya Range of India; the Gwangneung Forest Museum in the Korea National Arboretum; and the alpine zone of Changbai Mountain Nature Reserve, Jilin Province, China. The fungus is also known from Arctic and Alpine regions such as Iceland, Greenland, and the Murmansk region.

== Footnotes ==
=== Cited text ===
- Smith AH. (1947). North American species of Mycena. Ann Arbor: University of Michigan Press.
