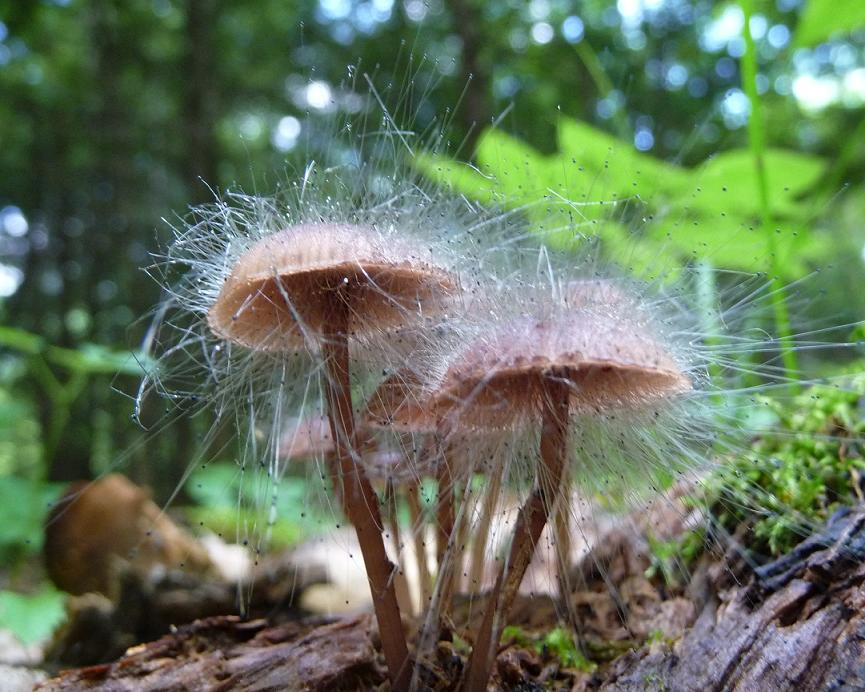
- Spinellus fusiger growing on Mycena haematopus

Scientific classification
- Kingdom: Fungi
- Division: Mucoromycota
- Class: Mucoromycetes
- Order: Mucorales
- Family: Phycomycetaceae
- Genus: Spinellus; Tiegh. (1875)

Type species
- Spinellus fusiger (Link) Tiegh. (1875)

Species
- See text

= Spinellus =

Genus of fungi

Spinellus is a genus of fungi in the Phycomycetaceae family. The widely distributed genus contains three species that are parasitic on agaric mushrooms. The genus was circumscribed by Phillippe Edouard Leon van Tieghem in 1875.

== Species ==
- Spinellus chalybeus
- Spinellus fusiger
- Spinellus sphaerosporus
