= M. californiensis =

M. californiensis may refer to:

- Mycena californiensis, a fungus species found in the coastal oak woodlands of California
- Medialuna californiensis, the halfmoon, an edible fish species found in the Pacific

== See also ==
- List of Latin and Greek words commonly used in systematic names § C
