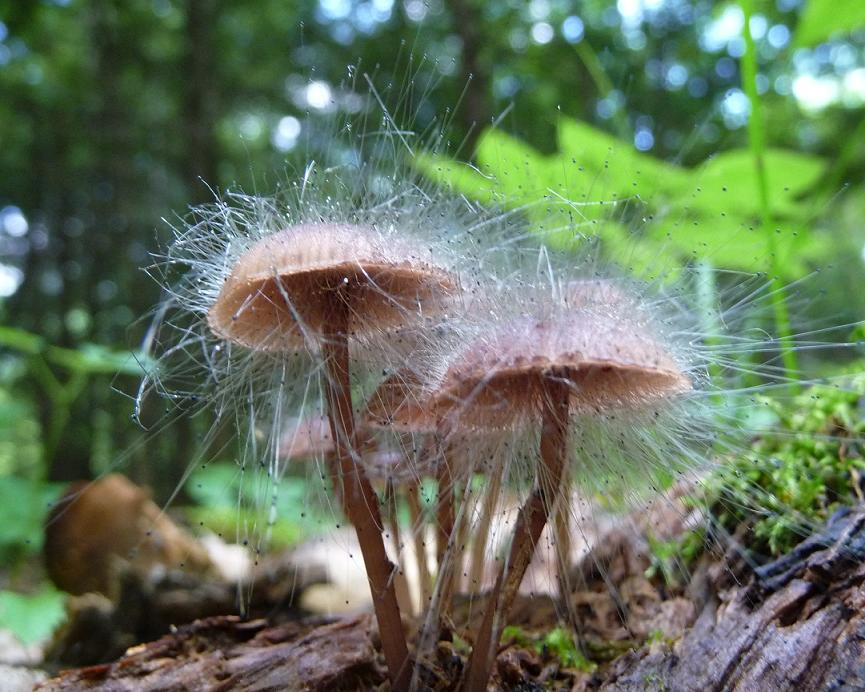
- Spinellus fusiger growing on Mycena haematopus

Scientific classification
- Kingdom: Fungi
- Division: Mucoromycota
- Class: Mucoromycetes
- Order: Mucorales
- Family: Phycomycetaceae
- Genus: Spinellus
- Species: S. fusiger

Binomial name
- Spinellus fusiger (Link) Tiegh. (1875)

Synonyms
- Mucor rhombosporus Ehrenb. (1818); Mucor fusiger Link (1824); Mucor macrocarpus Corda (1838); Spinellus macrocarpus (Corda) P.Karst. (1878); Spinellus rhombosporus (Ehrenb.) Pound (1894); Phycomyces agaricicola Boedijn (1958)

= Spinellus fusiger =

Species of fungus

Spinellus fusiger, commonly known as bonnet mold, is a species of fungus in the phylum Mucoromycota. It is a pin mold that is characterized by erect sporangiophores (specialized hyphae that bear a sporangium) that are simple in structure, brown or yellowish-brown in color, and with branched aerial filaments that bear the zygospores. It grows as a parasitic mold on mushrooms, including several species from the genera Mycena, including M. haematopus, M. pura, M. epipterygia, M. leptocephala, and various Collybia species, such as C. alkalivirens, C. luteifolia, C. dryophila, and C. butyracea. It has also been found growing on members of the genera Amanita, Gymnopus, and Hygrophorus.

== Taxonomy ==
The species was first described by German naturalist Christian Gottfried Ehrenberg in 1818 as Mucor rhombosporus, but he later conceded to making a mistake in examining the spores. Link later suggested the name Mucor fusiger for the species, and it has been known under a variety of names, such as Mucor macrocarpus, Phycomyces agaricicola, Spinellus macrocarpus, and Spinellus rhombosporus. It was assigned its current name by French botanist Philippe Édouard Léon Van Tieghem in 1875.

== Description ==
During the reproductive phase of its life cycle, Spinellus fusiger grows throughout the cap of the mushroom host, eventually breaking through to produce radiating reproductive stalks (sporangiophores) bearing minute, spherical, terminal spore-containing structures called sporangia. Ultimately, the spores in the sporangia are released after the breakdown of the outer sporangial wall, becoming passively dispersed to new locations via wind, water, and insects. The sporangia contain non-motile mitospores known as aplanospores. Like other Spinellus species, S. fusiger is homothallic, and sexual spores known as zygospores are produced following the union of branches called gametangia, that arise from the same mycelium.
