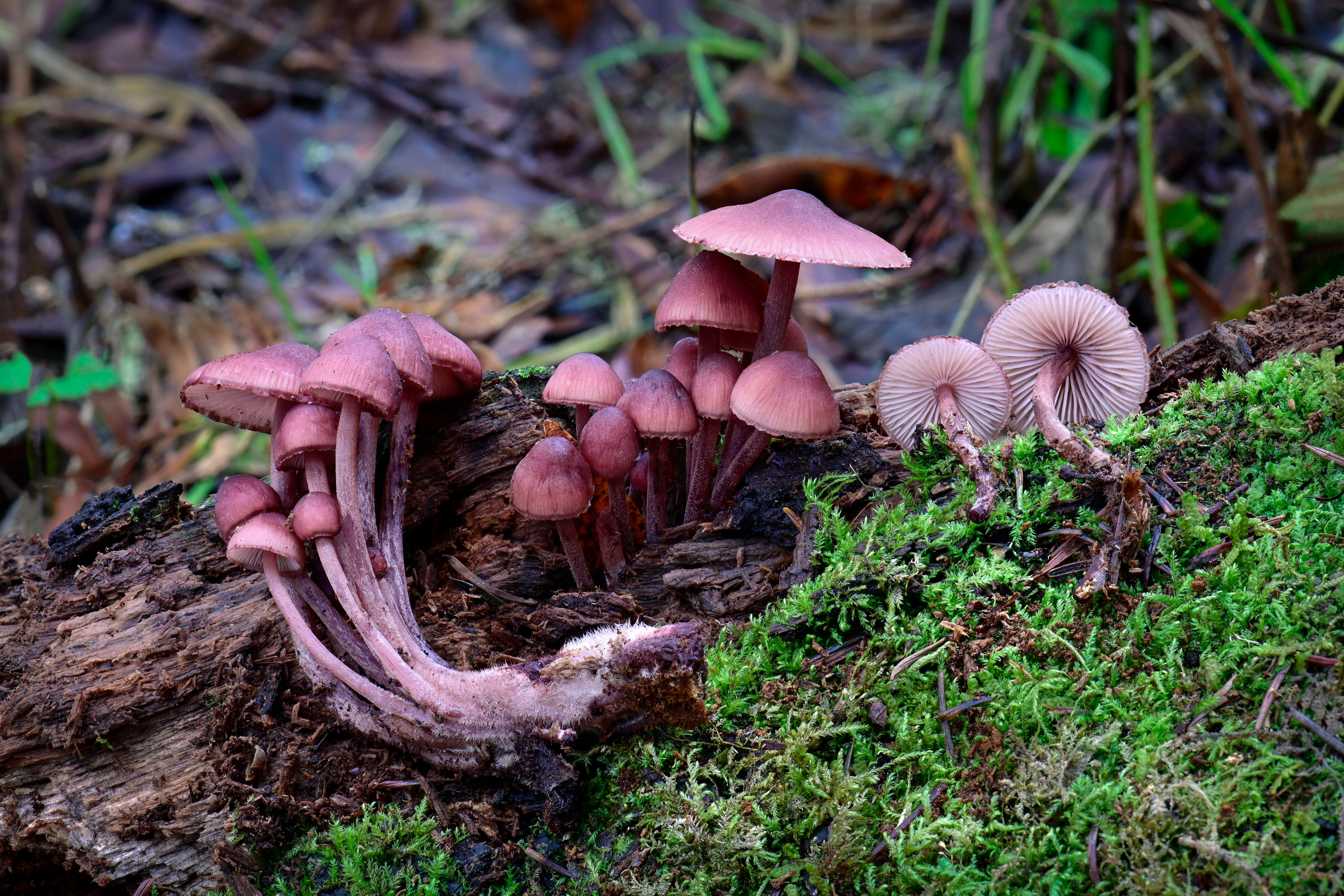

Scientific classification
- Kingdom: Fungi
- Division: Basidiomycota
- Class: Agaricomycetes
- Order: Agaricales
- Family: Mycenaceae
- Genus: Mycena
- Species: M. haematopus

Binomial name
- Mycena haematopus (Pers.) P.Kumm. (1871)

Synonyms
- Agaricus haematopus Pers. (1799); Mycena haematopus var. marginata J.E.Lange (1914); Galactopus haematopus (Pers.) Earle (1916)

= Mycena haematopus =

Species of fungus

Mycena haematopus
- Mycological characteristics
- Gills on hymenium
- Cap is conical or campanulate
- Hymenium is adnate
- Stipe is bare
- Spore print is white
- Ecology is saprotrophic
- Edibility is not recommended

Mycena haematopus, commonly known as the bleeding fairy helmet, the burgundydrop bonnet, or the bleeding Mycena, is a species of fungus in the family Mycenaceae, of the order Agaricales. First described scientifically in 1799, it is classified in the section Lactipedes of the genus Mycena, along with other species that produce a milky or colored latex.

The fruit bodies of M. haematopus have caps that are up to 4 cm (1 5/8 in) wide, whitish gills, and a thin, fragile reddish-brown stem with thick coarse hairs at the base. They are characterized by their reddish color, the scalloped cap edges, and the dark red latex they "bleed" when cut or broken. Both the fruit bodies and the mycelia are strongly bioluminescent.

It is widespread and common in Europe and North America, and has also been collected in old Japan and Venezuela. It is saprotrophic—meaning that it obtains nutrients by consuming decomposing organic matter—and the fruit bodies appear in small groups or clusters on the decaying logs, trunks, and stumps of deciduous trees, particularly beech. The edibility of the species is not known definitively. It produces various unique alkaloid pigments.

== Taxonomy ==
The species was initially named Agaricus haematopus by Christian Hendrik Persoon in 1799, and later sanctioned under this name by Elias Magnus Fries in his 1821 Systema Mycologicum. In the classification of Fries, only a few genera were named, and most agaric mushrooms were grouped in Agaricus, which was organized into a large number of tribes. Mycena haematopus gained its current name in 1871 when the German fungal taxonomist Paul Kummer raised many of Fries' Agaricus tribes to the level of genus, including Mycena. In 1909 Franklin Sumner Earle placed the species in Galactopus, a genus that is no longer considered separate from Mycena. Mycena haematopus is placed in the section Lactipedes, a grouping of Mycenas characterized by the presence of a milky or colored latex in the stem and flesh of the cap. The specific epithet is derived from Ancient Greek roots meaning "blood" (αἱματο-, haimato-) and "foot" (πους, pous), owing to the red latex than can easily be produced by breaking the mushroom at the base. It is commonly known as the blood-foot mushroom, the bleeding fairy helmet, the burgundydrop bonnet, or the bleeding Mycena.

In 1914, Jakob Emanuel Lange described the variety M. haematopus var. marginata, characterized by the reddish color on the edge of the gills; Mycena specialist Rudolph Arnold Maas Geesteranus considered the coloration of the gill edge too variable to have taxonomical significance. Mycena haematopus var. cuspidata was initially found in Colorado in 1976, and described as a new variety by American mycologists Duane Mitchel and Alexander H. Smith two years later. The fruit bodies are characterized by a "beak" on the cap that often splits or collapses as the cap matures. It was treated as Mycena sanguinolenta var. cuspidata by Maas Geesteranus in 1988.

== Description ==
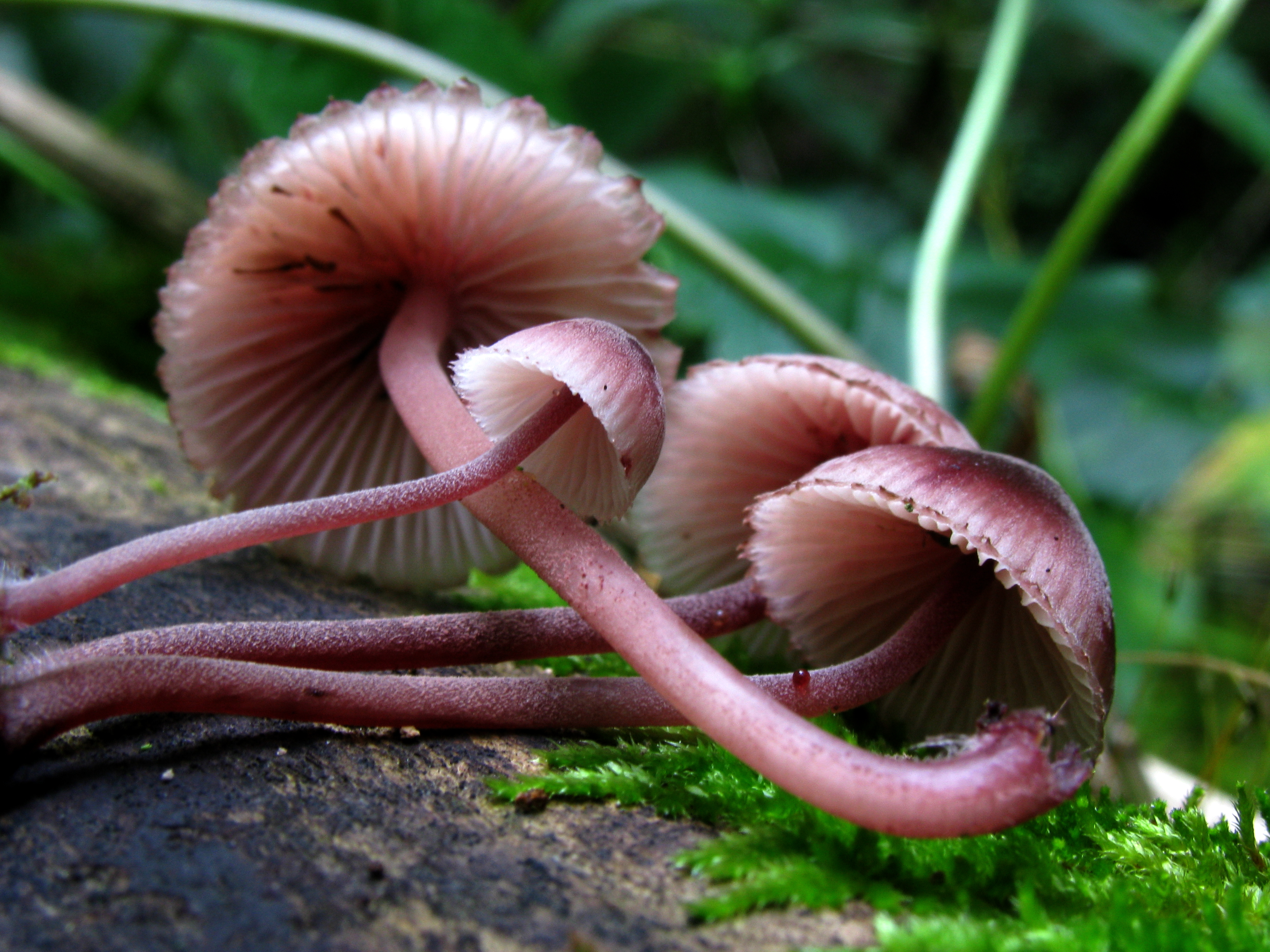
Young fruit bodies are pruinose—as if covered with a fine white powder.

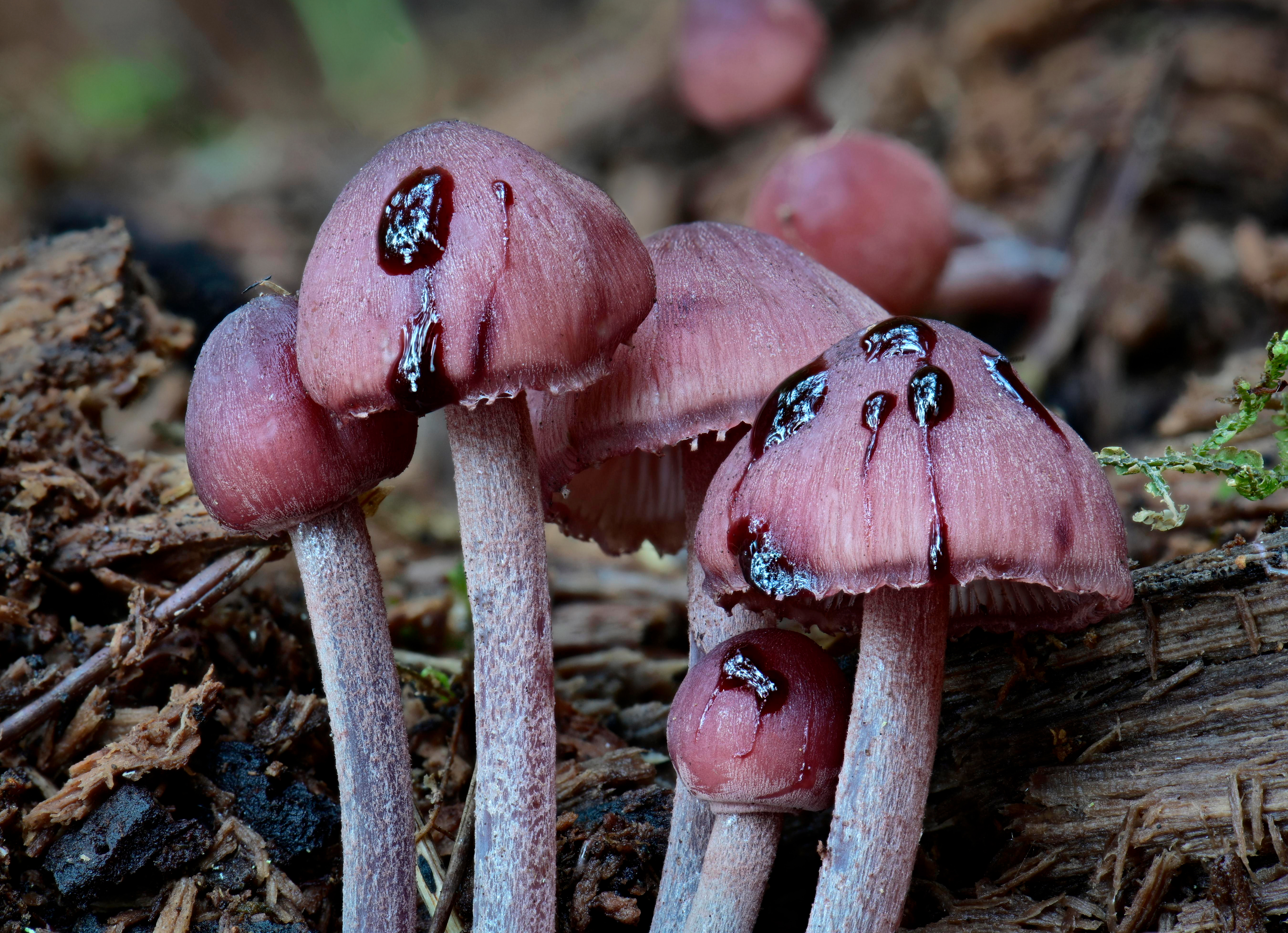
Injured mushroom tissue oozes a reddish latex.

The fruit bodies of Mycena haematopus are the reproductive structures produced by cellular threads or hyphae which grow in rotting wood. The shape of the cap of the fruit body will vary depending on its maturity. Young caps, or "buttons", are ovoid (egg-shaped) to conical; later they are campanulate (bell-shaped), and as the fruit body matures, the margins (cap edge) lift upward so that the cap becomes somewhat flat with an umbo (a central nipple-shaped bump). The fully grown cap can reach up to 4 cm (1 5/8 in) in diameter. The surface of the cap initially appears dry and covered with what appears to be a very fine whitish powder, but it soon becomes polished and moist. Mature caps appear somewhat translucent, and develop radial grooves mirroring the position of the gills underneath. The color of the cap is reddish- or pinkish-brown, often tinged with violet, and paler towards the edge. The margin is wavy like the edge of a scallop and may appear ragged because of lingering remnants of the partial veil.

The gills have an adnate attachment to the stem, meaning they are more or less directly attached to it. They are initially whitish or "grayish vinaceous" in color, and can develop reddish-brown stains. Between 20 and 30 gills reach from the cap edge to the stem, resulting in a gill spacing that is described as "close to subdistant"—gaps are visible between adjacent gills. There are additional gills, called lamellulae, that do not extend directly from the margin to the stem; these are arranged in two or three series (tiers) of equal length. The stem is 3–9 cm (1 1/8–3 1/2 in) tall and 0.1–0.2 cm (1/32–3/32 in) thick, hollow and brittle, and a dark reddish-brown color. In young fruit bodies, the upper part of the stem is densely covered with a pale cinnamon-colored powder which wears off with age. The stem has a mass of coarse hairs at the base.

The mushroom flesh can range from pale to the color of red wine (vinaceous), and has no distinctive odor. It oozes a red latex when cut or otherwise injured. The flavour is mild to slightly bitter.

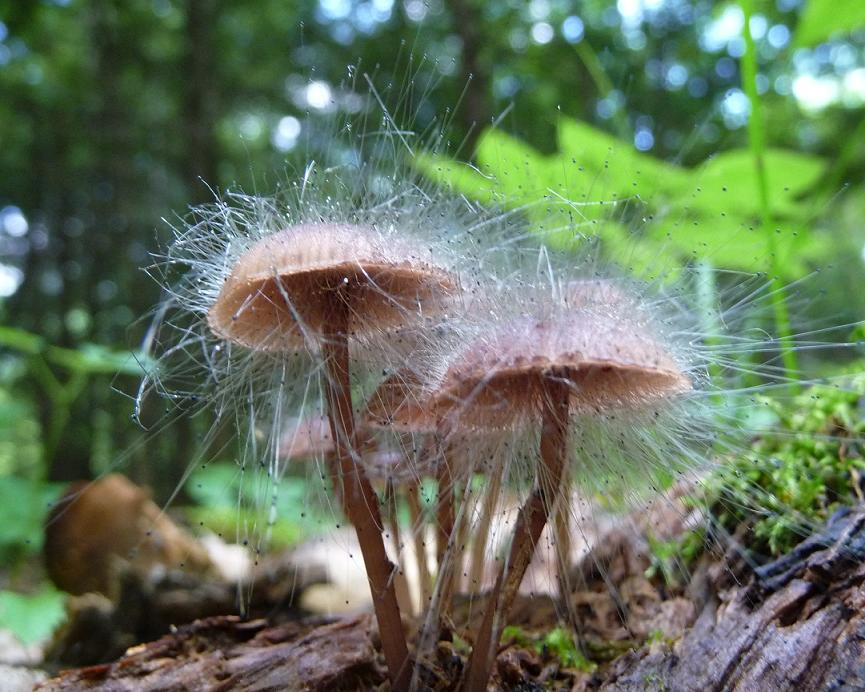
Mycena haematopus parasitized by the bonnet mold Spinellus fusiger

=== Bioluminescence ===
Both the mycelium and the fruit bodies of M. haematopus (both young and mature specimens) are reported to be bioluminescent. However, the luminescence is quite weak, and not visible to the dark-adapted eye; in one study, light emission was detectable only after 20 hours of exposure to X-ray film. Although the biochemical basis of bioluminescence in M. haematopus has not been scientifically investigated, in general, bioluminescence is caused by the action of luciferases, enzymes that produce light by the oxidation of a luciferin (a pigment). The biological purpose of bioluminescence in fungi is not definitively known, although several hypotheses have been suggested: it may help attract insects to help with spore dispersal, it may be a by-product of other biochemical functions, or it may help deter heterotrophs that might consume the fungus.

=== Microscopic characteristics ===
The spore print is white. The spores are elliptical, smooth, with dimensions of 8–11 by 5–7 μm. They are amyloid, meaning they will absorb iodine when stained with Melzer's reagent. The spore-bearing cells (basidia) are 4-spored. Sterile cells called cystidia are numerous on the edges on the gills; they measure 33–60 μm (sometimes up to 80) by 9–12 μm. Cystidia that are present on the stipe (caulocystidia) appear in clusters, and clublike to irregular in shape, measuring 20–55 by 3.5–12.5 μm. The gill tissue contains numerous lactifers, cells that produce the latex that is secreted when it is cut.

The surface mycelium is whitish and fluffy. Swelling at the terminal tips of hyphae (diameter up to 12 μm) is present, but not very abundant, and moniliform hyphae are very rare. Extracellular oxidase enzymes are present, consistent with its ecological role as a saprobe.

=== Similar species ===
Another Mycena that produces a reddish latex is M. sanguinolenta (the terrestrial bleeding Mycena). It may be distinguished from M. haematopus in several ways: it is smaller, with cap diameters between 0.3 to 1 cm (1/8 to 3/8 in) wide; grows in groups rather than clusters; is found on leaves, dead branches, moss beds and pine needle beds rather than decaying wood; and the edges of its gills are consistently dark brownish-red. Furthermore, the cap color of M. sanguinolenta ranges from reddish-to orange-brown and it lacks a band of partial veil remnants hanging from the margin.

Other similar species include M. californiensis and M. purpureofusca.

== Distribution, habitat and ecology ==
In North America, M. haematopus is distributed from Alaska southward. According to Mycena specialist Alexander H. Smith, it is "the commonest and the most easily recognized one in the genus". The species is common in Europe and has also been collected from Japan, and Mérida, Venezuela (as the variety M. haematopus var. marginata). In the Netherlands, M. haematopus is one of many mushrooms that can regularly be found fruiting on ancient timber wharves. The fruit bodies can be found year-round in mild weather.

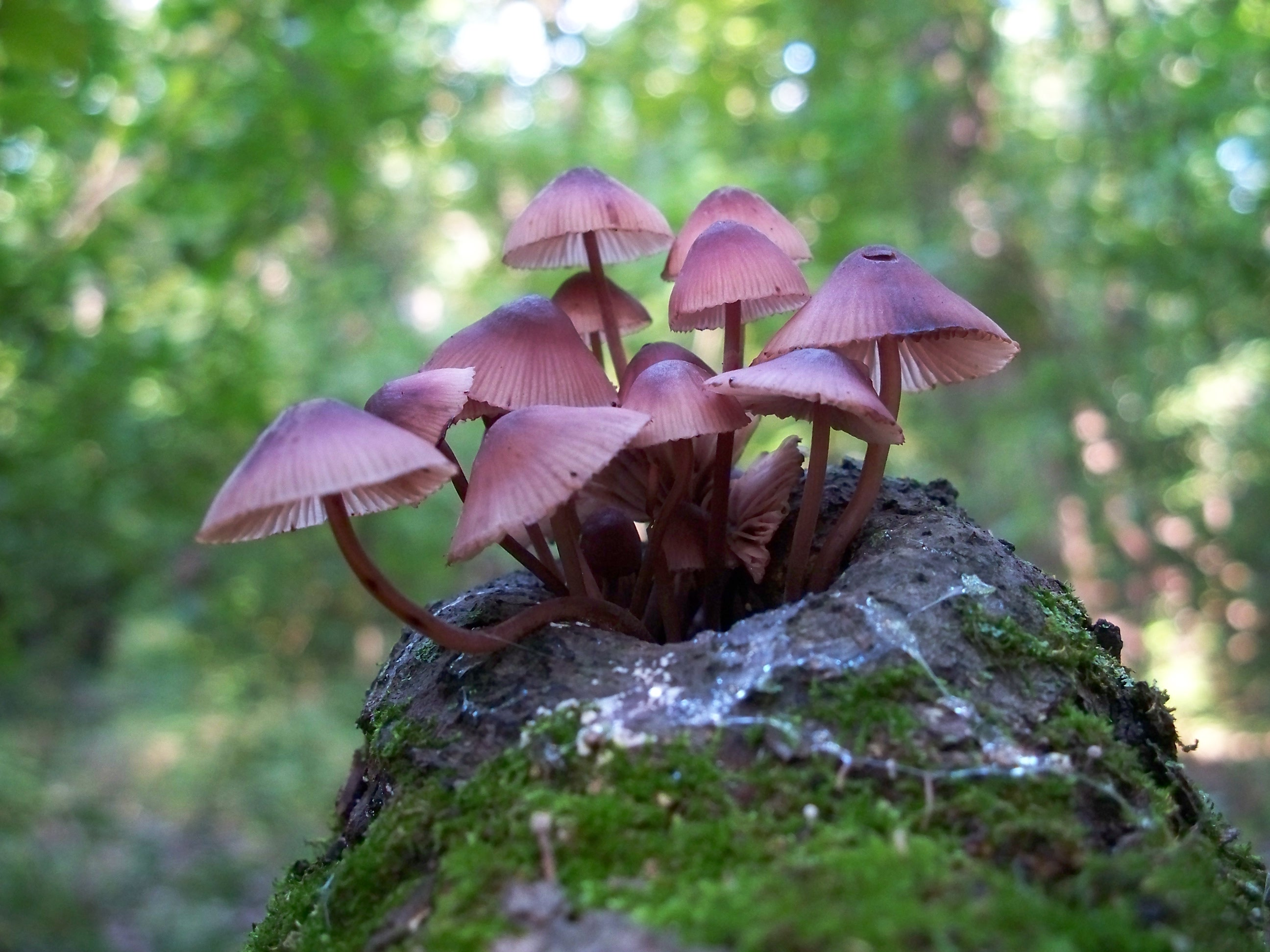
The fruit bodies typically grow in clusters joined at a common base.

The mushroom obtains nutrients from decomposing organic matter (saprobic) and the fruit bodies can typically be found growing on stumps and well-decayed logs, usually in groups that are joined together by a common base. The decomposition of woody debris on the forest floor is the result of the combined activity of a community of fungal species. In the sequential succession of mushrooms species, M. haematopus is a "late colonizer" fungus: its fruit bodies appear after the wood has first been decayed by white rot species. The initial stage of wood decay by white rot fungi involves the breakdown of "acid-unhydrolyzable residue" and holocellulose (a mixture of cellulose and hemicellulose).

Mycena haematopus can be parasitized by Spinellus fusiger, another fungal species which gives the mushroom a strikingly hairy appearance.

== Edibility ==
Although some sources claim that M. haematopus is edible, it is disregarded due to being insubstantial. Other sources consider the species inedible, or recommend avoiding consumption due to the potential toxicity of related taxa.

== Natural products ==
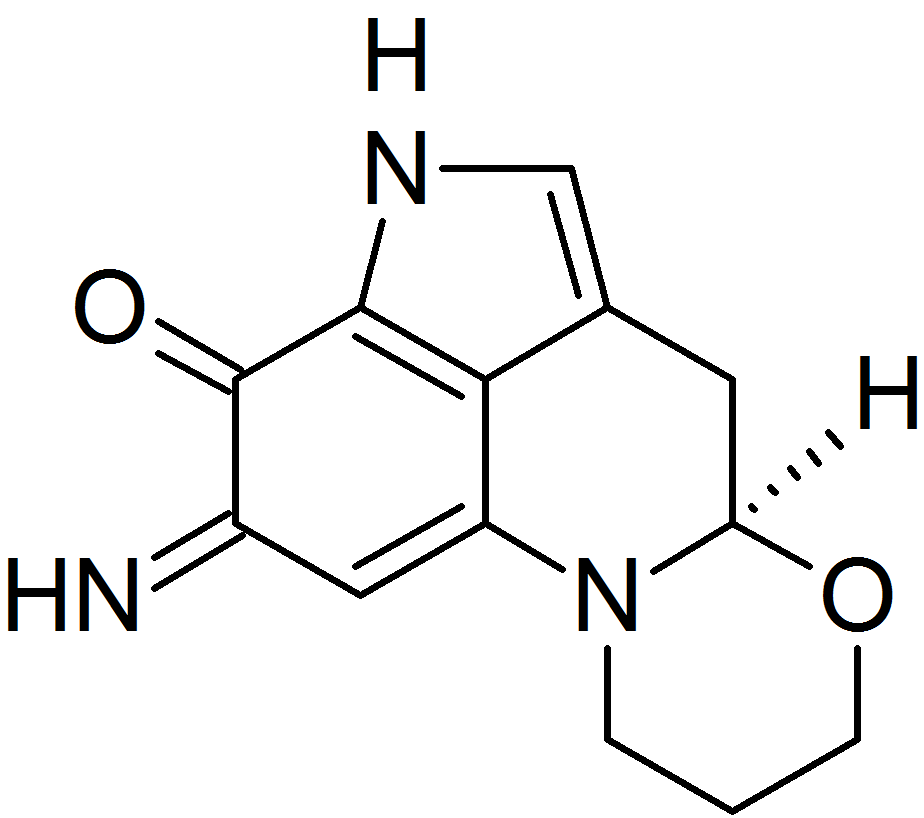
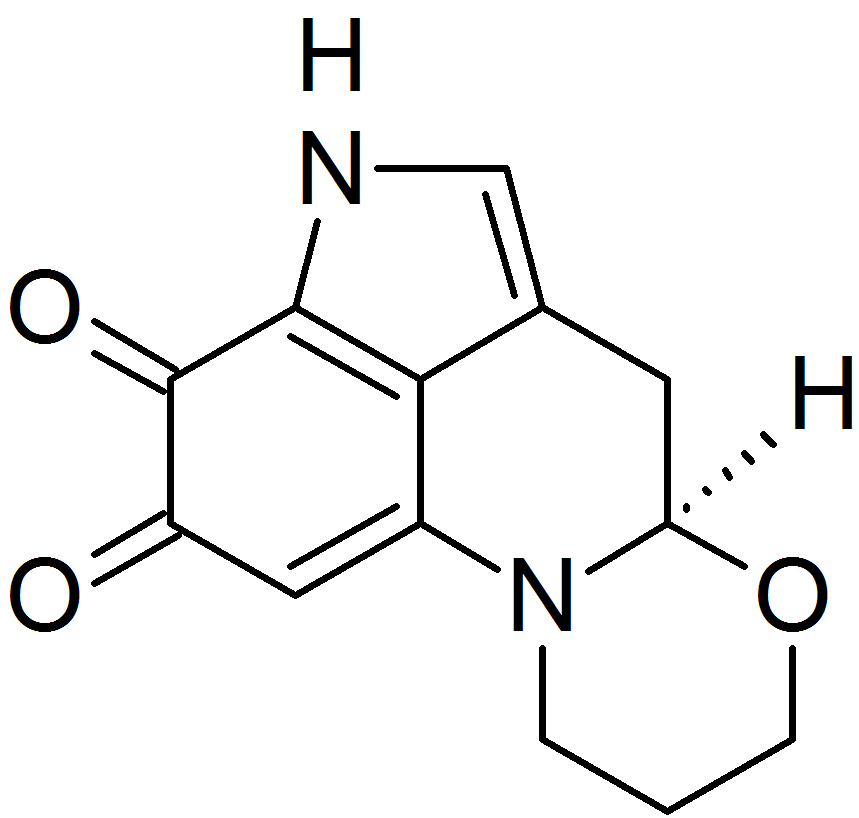
Haematopodin B (left) and its more stable breakdown product Haematopodin (right)

The species produces several unique chemicals. The primary pigment is haematopodin B, which is so chemically sensitive (breaking down upon exposure to air and light) that its more stable breakdown product, haematopodin, was known before its eventual discovery and characterization in 2008. A chemical synthesis for haematopodin was reported in 1996. Haematopodins are the first pyrroloquinoline alkaloids discovered in fungi; pyrroloquinolines combine the structures of pyrrole and quinoline, both heterocyclic aromaticorganic compounds. Compounds of this type also occur in marine sponges and are attracting research interest due to various biological properties, such as cytotoxicity against tumor cell lines, and both antifungal and antimicrobial activities. Additional alkaloid compounds in M. haematopus include the red pigments mycenarubins D, E and F. Prior to the discovery of these compounds, pyrroloquinoline alkaloids were considered to be rare in terrestrial sources.

== See also ==
- List of bioluminescent fungi
