= Haematopodin B =

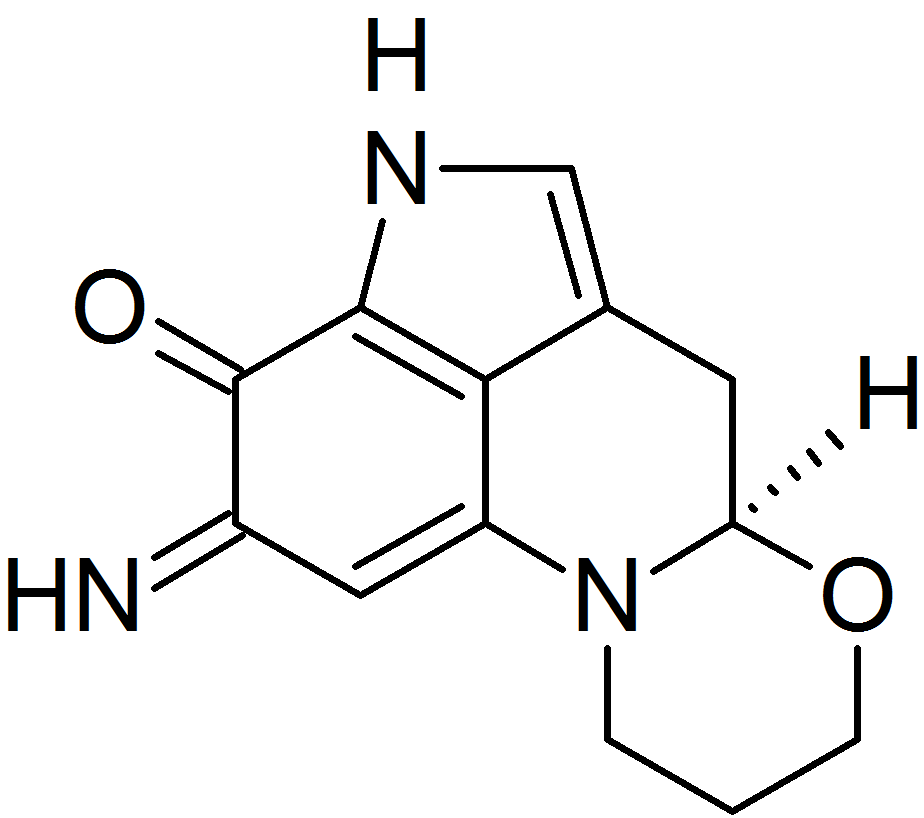

Names
- Preferred IUPAC name (6aR)-2-Imino-2,4,6,6a,9,10-hexahydro-3H,8H-[1,3]oxazino[3,2-a]pyrrolo[4,3,2-de]quinolin-3-one

Identifiers
CAS Number	1032121-80-4
3D model (JSmol)	Interactive image
ChEBI	CHEBI:199737
ChemSpider	28284749
PubChem CID	135693512
CompTox Dashboard (EPA)	DTXSID401336202
- InChI: InChI=1S/C13H13N3O2/c14-8-5-9-11-7(6-15-12(11)13(8)17)4-10-16(9)2-1-3-18-10/h5-6,10,14-15H,1-4H2/t10-/m1/s1 Key: CLAPNKMEQIYQLC-SNVBAGLBSA-N
- SMILES: C1CN2[C@@H](CC3=CNC4=C3C2=CC(=N)C4=O)OC1

Properties
Chemical formula	C_{13}H_{13}N_{3}O_{2}
Molar mass	243.266 g·mol^{−1}
- Except where otherwise noted, data are given for materials in their standard state (at 25 °C [77 °F], 100 kPa). verify (what is ?) Infobox references

Haematopodin B is a chemical compound that is found in the mushroom Mycena haematopus. It decomposes to haematopodin under the influence of air and light.
