= Haematopodin =

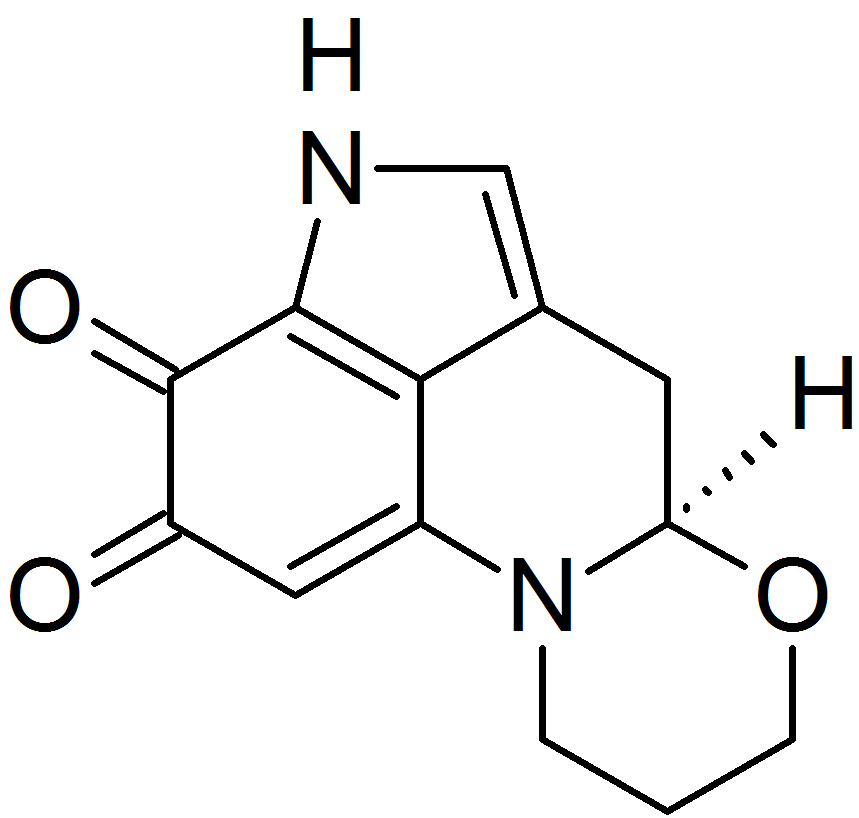

Names
- Preferred IUPAC name (6aR)-6,6a,9,10-Tetrahydro-2H,8H-[1,3]oxazolo[3,2-a]pyrrolo[4,3,2-de]quinoline-2,3(4H)-dione

Identifiers
CAS Number	151964-21-5
3D model (JSmol)	Interactive image
ChemSpider	10473906
PubChem CID	10857709
UNII	838N74Y28P
CompTox Dashboard (EPA)	DTXSID201046081
- InChI: InChI=1S/C13H12N2O3/c16-9-5-8-11-7(6-14-12(11)13(9)17)4-10-15(8)2-1-3-18-10/h5-6,10,14H,1-4H2/t10-/m1/s1 Key: GTVMGUBGOSWMOJ-SNVBAGLBSA-N
- SMILES: O=C3/C=C2/N4CCCO[C@@H]4Cc1c[nH]c(c12)C3=O

Properties
Chemical formula	C_{13}H_{12}N_{2}O_{3}
Molar mass	244.250 g·mol^{−1}
- Except where otherwise noted, data are given for materials in their standard state (at 25 °C [77 °F], 100 kPa). verify (what is ?) Infobox references

Haematopodin is the more stable breakdown product of Haematopodin B. Both compounds are found in the mushroom Mycena haematopus, although haematopodin only occurs in trace amounts in fresh fruit bodies. Similar pigments (with the 1,3,4,5-tetrahydropyrrolo[4,3,2-de]quinoline structure), known as batzellins and damirones, have been found in sea sponges. A chemical synthesis for haematopodin was reported in 1996. Key steps in the synthesis involved the addition of 3-[(2,4-dimethoxybenzyl)amino]-1-propanol to the indolo-6,7-quinone and cyclization of the resulting adduct with trifluoroacetic acid.
