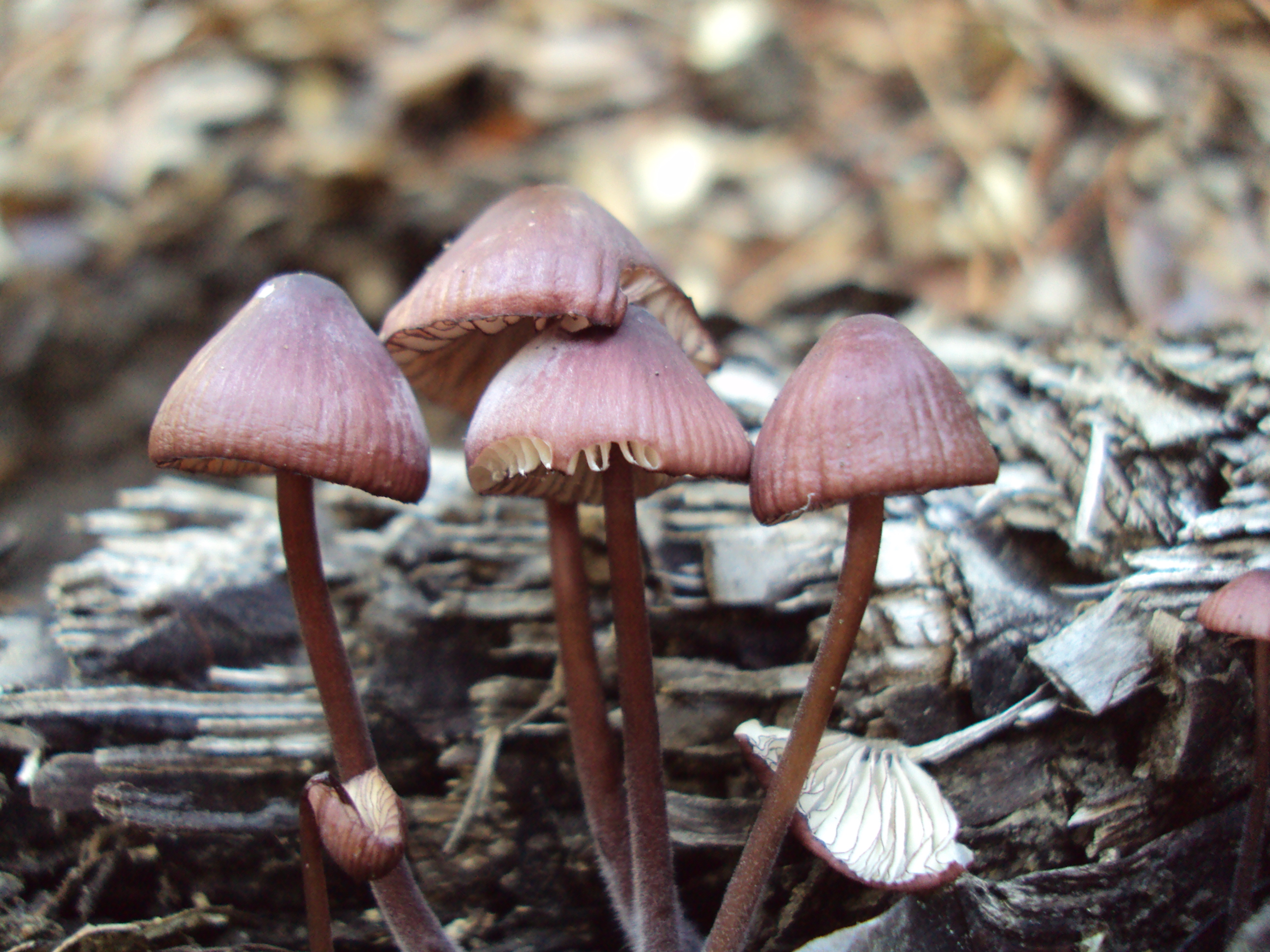

Scientific classification
- Kingdom: Fungi
- Division: Basidiomycota
- Class: Agaricomycetes
- Order: Agaricales
- Family: Mycenaceae
- Genus: Mycena
- Species: M. purpureofusca

Binomial name
- Mycena purpureofusca (Peck) Sacc. (1887)

Synonyms
- Mycena atromarginata var. fuscopurpurea P.Karst. (1879); Agaricus purpureofuscus Peck (1885); Prunulus purpureofuscus (Peck) Murrill (1916); Mycena sulcata Velen. (1920)

= Mycena purpureofusca =

Species of fungus

Mycena purpureofusca Mycological characteristics
- Gills on hymenium
- Cap is conical
- Hymenium is adnate
- Stipe is bare
- Spore print is white
- Ecology is saprotrophic
- Edibility is unknown

Mycena purpureofusca, commonly known as the purple edge bonnet, is a species of agaric fungus in the family Mycenaceae. First described by Charles Horton Peck in 1885, The mushroom is named for the characteristic dark greyish-purple color of its gill edges.

The fruit bodies have conical to bell-shaped purple caps up to 2.5 cm (1 in) set atop slender stipes up to 10 cm (4 in) long. In the field, the mushrooms can usually be distinguished from similar species by characteristics such as the dark purple gill edges, the deep purple cap center, and its cartilagineous consistency.

The species is found in Europe and North America, where it grows on the decaying wood and debris of conifers, including cones. It contains a laccase enzyme that has been investigated scientifically for its potential to detoxify recalcitrant industrial dyes used in textile dyeing and printing processes.

== Taxonomy ==
The species was first described as Agaricus purpureofuscus by American mycologist Charles Horton Peck in 1885. The type collection was made in Caroga, New York, from a moss-covered trunk of spruce. Pier Andrea Saccardo transferred it to Mycena in 1887, giving it the name by which it is currently known. William Alphonso Murrill moved it to Prunulus in 1916, but this genus has since been subsumed in Mycena. In 1879, Petter Karsten described a collection made in Scandinavia as Mycena atromarginata var. fuscopurpurea, but Rudolph Arnold Maas Geesteranus later placed this in synonymy with M. purpureofusca. Another synonym, according to Maas Geesteranus, is Mycena sulcata, described by Josef Velenovský in 1920 from Czechoslovakia.

Alexander H. Smith classified the species in section Calodontes, subsection Ciliatae of Mycena in his 1947 monograph on North American Mycena. Rolf Singer put it in the section Rubromarginata in his 1986 The Agaricales in Modern Taxonomy, a group characterized by having distinct red marginate gills. The specific epithet purpureofuscus combines the Latin words purpur (purple) and fusco (dark or dusky). It is commonly known as the "purple edge bonnet".

== Description ==
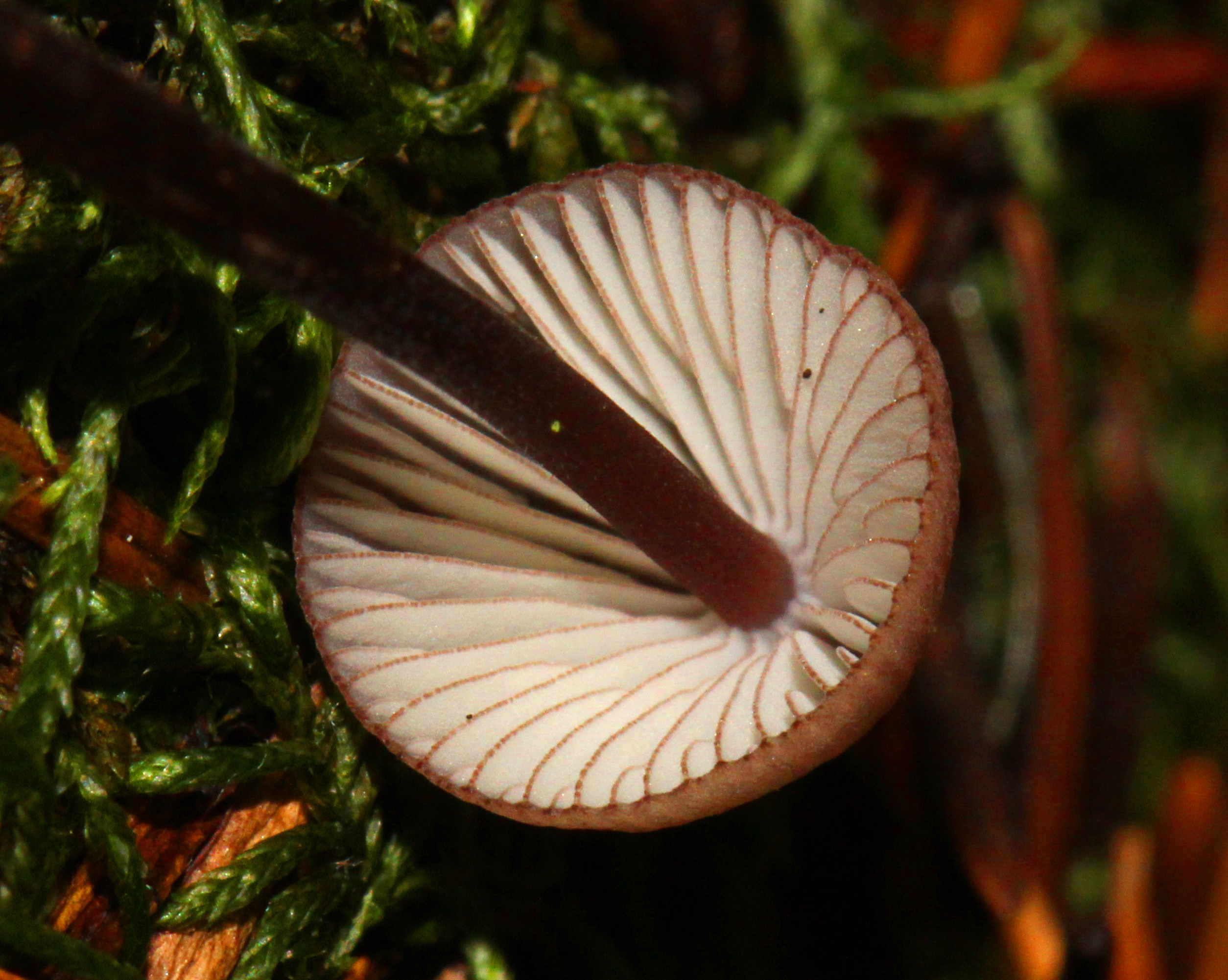
The gill edges are colored dark greyish-purple.

The cap is conical to bell-shaped, flattening in age, and reaches a diameter of 0.5–2.5 cm (0.2–1.0 in). The cap margin is usually bent inwards initially. The cap surface is initially covered with tiny white hairs, but later becomes smooth. It is slightly hygrophanous, and when moist, is slightly translucent, so that the outline of the gills underneath are apparent. Its color is dark purple in the center, fading to pale lilac at the margins; older specimens are purplish-gray. The flesh is thin and pliant, with a texture similar to cartilage. It is initially purplish-gray, becoming pale lilac to white in age. The odor is mild and the taste is indistinctive.

The narrow gills have an ascending attachment to the stipe and are narrowly adnate. They are somewhat closely spaced, with pallid to grayish face color and dark grayish purple edges that are sometimes fringed. The tubular stipe measures 3–10 cm (1.2–3.9 in) long by 1–3 mm thick. It is tough and cartilaginous, and its base it covered with white hairs. Overall, its color is that of the cap or paler, and often paler near the top.

The spores are broadly ellipsoid in shape, amyloid, and have dimensions of either 8–10 by 6–7 μm or 10–14 by 6.7–8.5 μm depending on whether they originated from four-or two-spored basidia (spore-bearing cells), respectively. There are abundant cheilocystidia on the gill edges. They measure 30–50 by 7–12 μm, and are fusoid-ventricose, with tips that are broadly rounded. They are filled with a purplish sap and have granular contents. The cap tissue comprises a well-differentiated cuticle, a distinct hypoderm, and a filamentous tramal body. Clamp connections in the hyphae are rare or absent.

=== Similar species ===
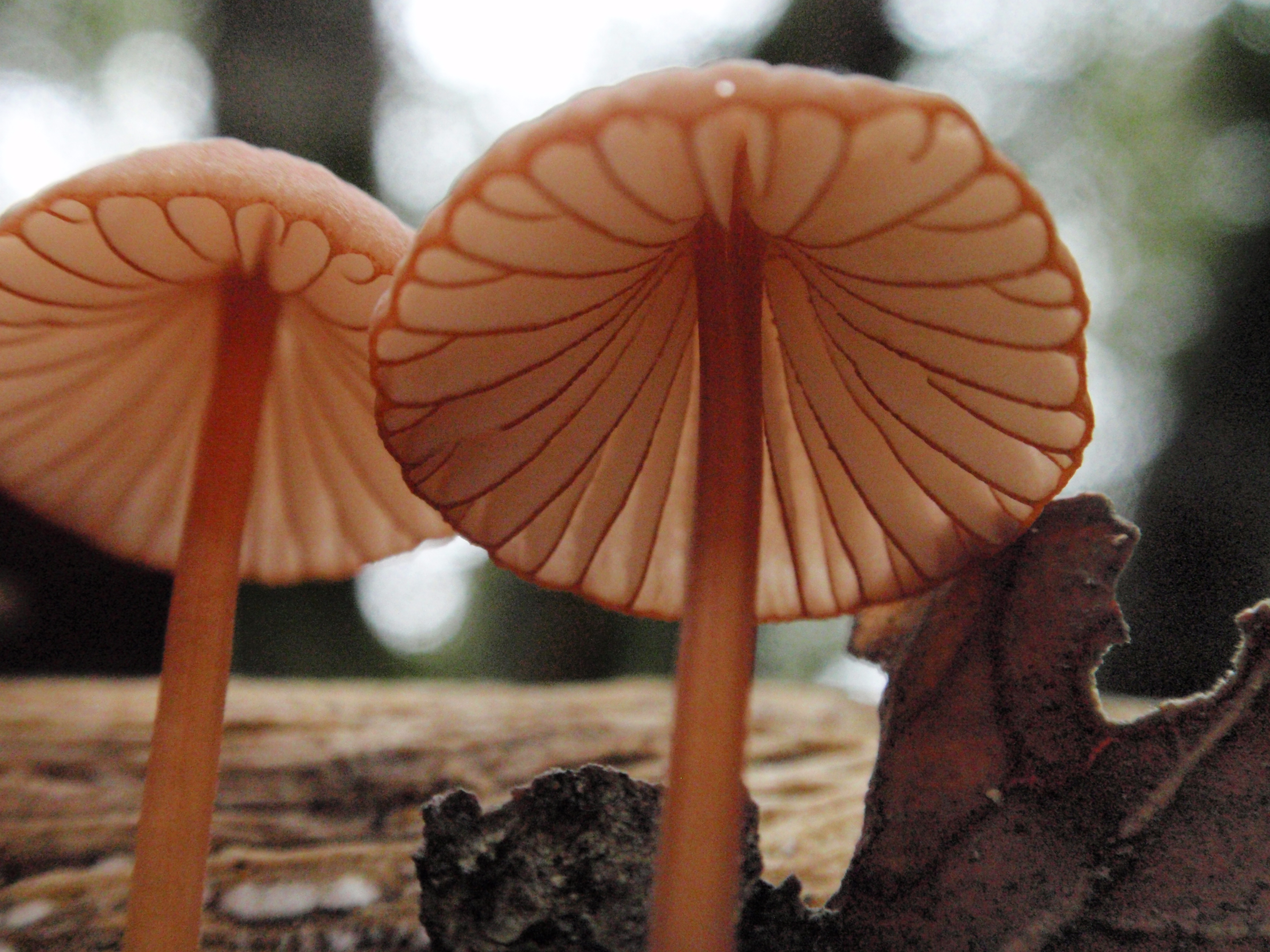
M. californiensis has reddish gill edges.

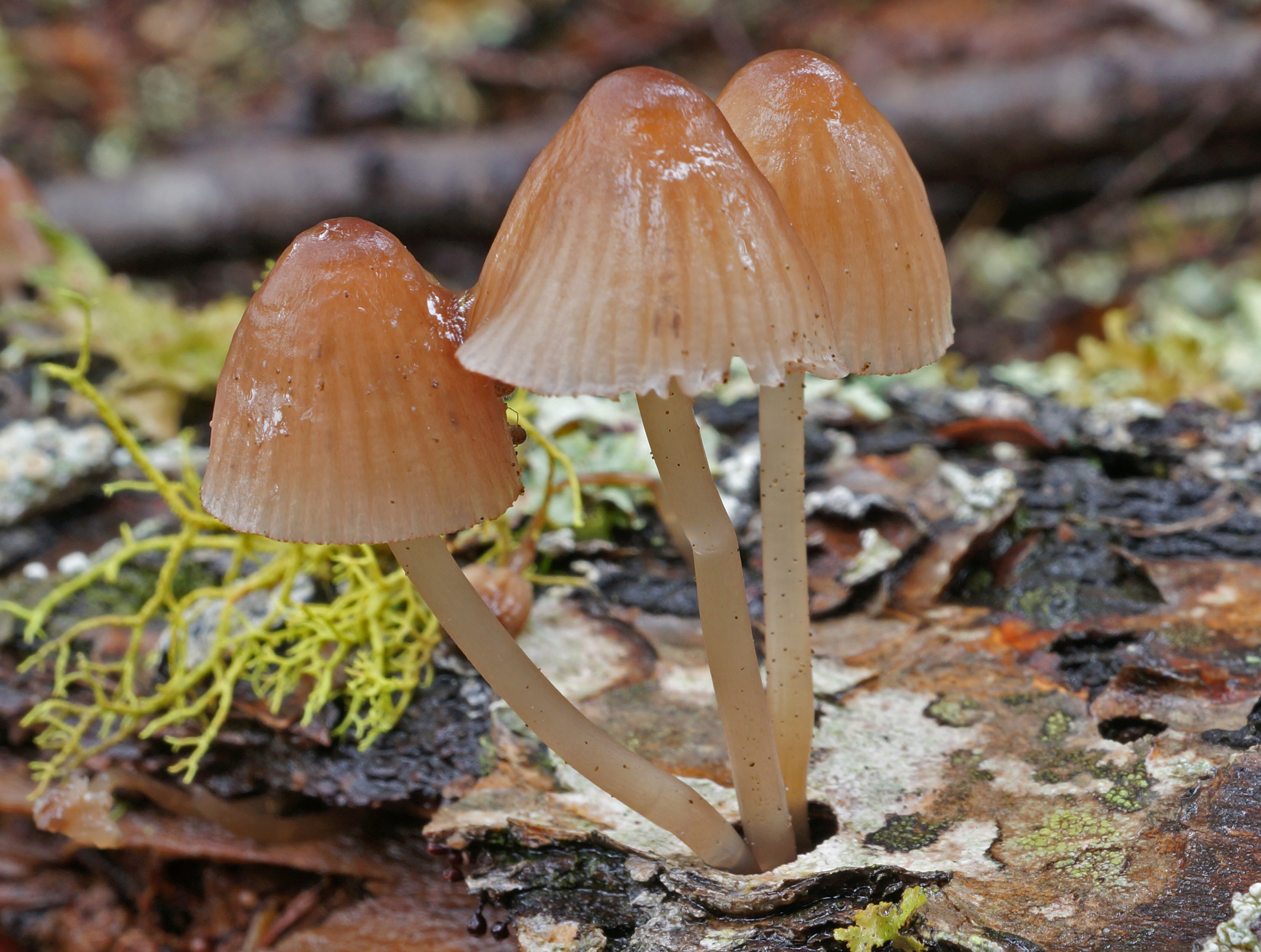
M. rubromarginata has a browner coloration.

Field characteristics that help to distinguish M. purpureofusca from similar species include the dark purple gill edges, the deep purple cap center, and its cartilagineous consistency. M. californiensis is similar, but has gill edges colored rosy to vinaceous-brown, and its cap is browner. It has an orange to orange-brown cap, a stipe the exudes red juice when injured, and grows in lead litter under oaks. Mitchel and Smith noted that there was considerable intergradation between the two species. The bioluminescent fungus M. lux-coeli is another allied species, but it has smaller spores (8.5–12 by 6.5–9 μm) and its cystidia are more lobed. Another similar "bleeding" Mycena is M. haematopus, which usually grows in clusters on rotting wood. In his original protologue, Peck mentioned that he considered the species closely related to M. rubromarginata, but could be distinguished by its darker color and "non-hygrophanous striate pileus." Microscopically, M. rubromarginata differs from M. purpureofusca in having abundant clamp connections and narrow necks on the cheilocystidia.

M. bulliformis is another species of section Rubromarginatae that resembles M. purpureofusca and is genetically its closest relative. Both share violaceous to reddish gill edges, but M. bulliformis typically has reddish-brown to violaceous-brown coloration rather than deep purple, and lacks the raphanoid (radish-like) odor characteristic of M. purpureofusca. In addition, the pileipellis and stipe cortical hyphae of M. bulliformis are not embedded in gelatinous layers, whereas in M. purpureofusca they usually are.

Mycena sanguinolenta – This smaller species also bleeds a reddish juice when injured. Its caps are usually under 1.5 cm across, much smaller than those of M. purpureofusca, and the coloration tends to be paler reddish-brown. It is typically found in conifer duff rather than on wood.

== Habitat and distribution ==
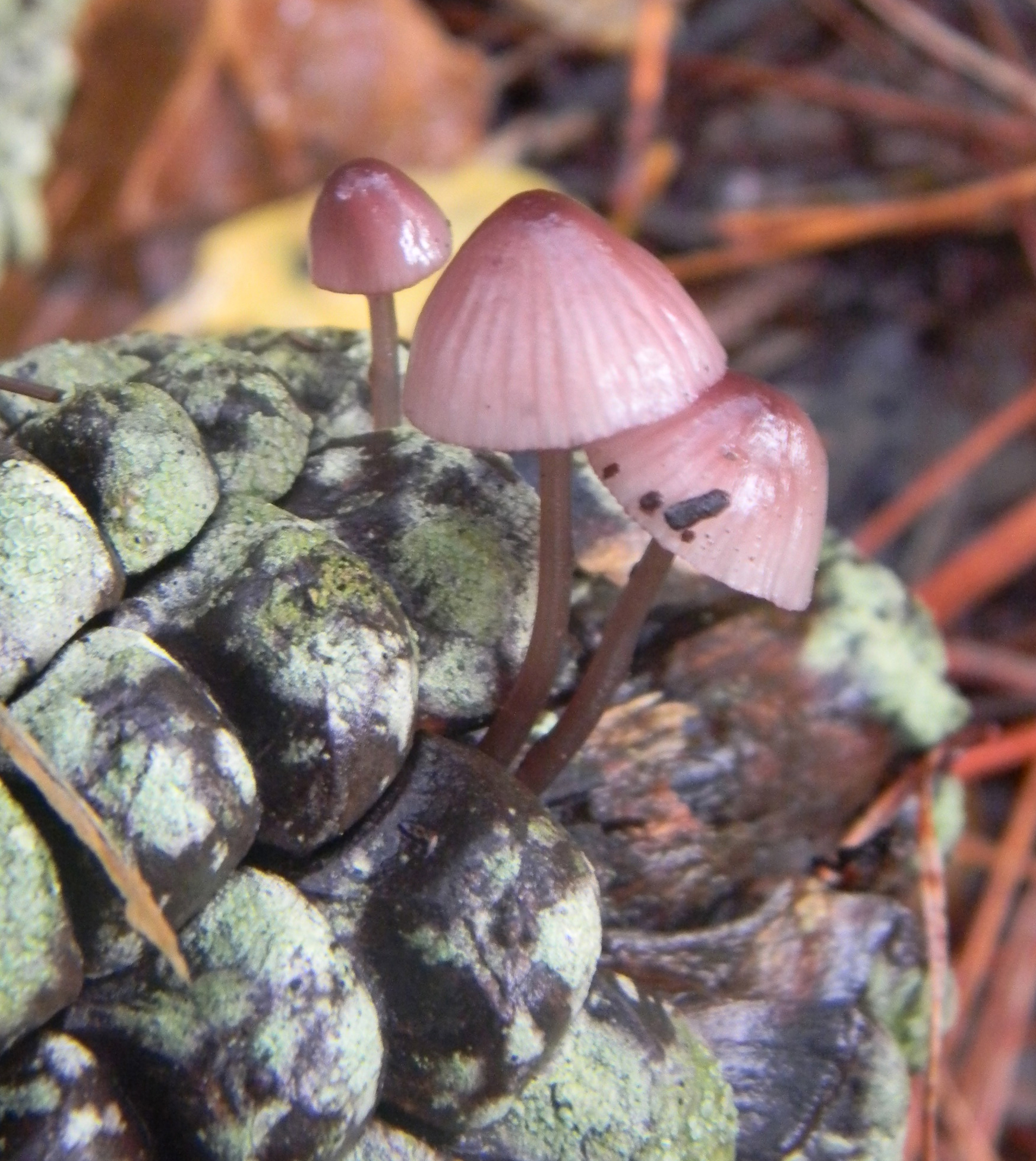
The fruit bodies often grow on pine cones.

The fruit bodies grow singly or in clusters on the decaying wood of conifers, particularly spruce, pine, and Douglas-fir. It is commonly found on decaying pine cones. In a European study, the fungus was found growing on logs in a state of decay where the wood was mostly hard, with most of the bark left, to wood that had decayed to the point that it was mostly soft throughout.

In North America, the fungus has been recorded in North Carolina, Tennessee, New York, Michigan, Montana, Idaho, Washington, Oregon, California, Virginia, and South Dakota. In Canada, it has been found in Ontario. Smith noted that collections from Michigan are likely to be found on old hemlock knots lying in the soil, where it usually fruits singly; it tends to grow in clusters on logs and stumps. In Europe, it has been recorded from Britain, Scotland, the Czech Republic, Poland, Germany, Turkey and Austria. In the UK, the fungus is commonly found in Caledonian pine woods, and it is considered an indicator species for that habitat type.

== Research ==
The edibility of the mushroom is unknown.

The species has been investigated for its potential to decolorize industrial dyes. These dyes, used in textile dyeing and printing processes, are difficult to degrade due to their highly structured organic compounds and pose a major environmental threat. The mycelium produces high levels of laccase, an oxidoreductase enzyme. Laccases are widely used in biotechnology and industry due to their ability to break down various recalcitrant compounds. M. purpureofusca laccase efficiently breaks down Remazol Brilliant Blue R, an industrially important dye that is frequently used as a starting material in the production of polymeric dyes.

Strobilurin A has been isolated from the fruit bodies. Strobilurins have fungicidal activities and well known for their broad fungicidal spectrum, low toxicity against mammalian cells, and environmentally benign characteristics.
