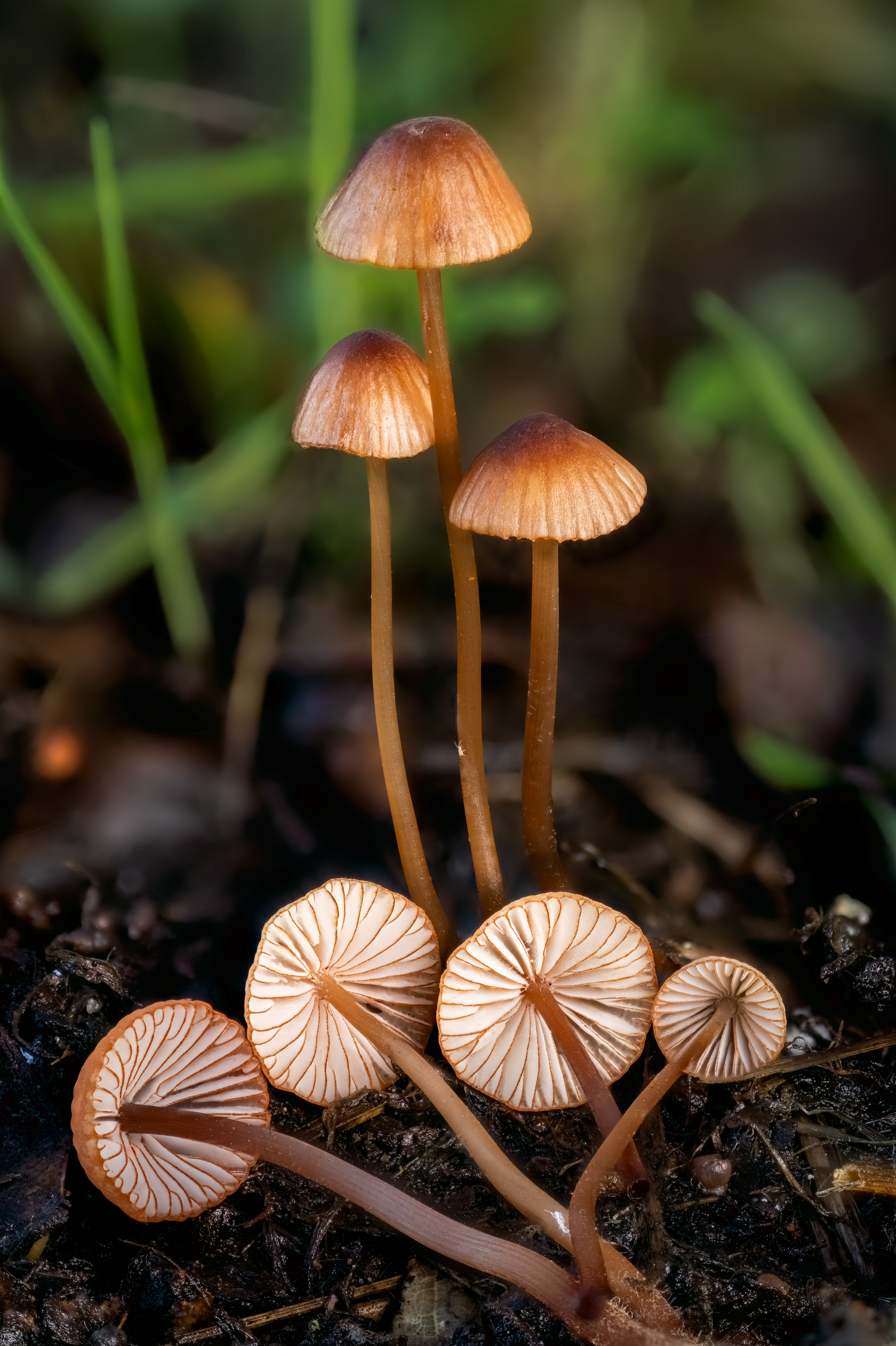

Scientific classification
- Kingdom: Fungi
- Division: Basidiomycota
- Class: Agaricomycetes
- Order: Agaricales
- Family: Mycenaceae
- Genus: Mycena
- Species: M. californiensis

Binomial name
- Mycena californiensis (Berk. & M.A.Curtis) Sacc. (1887)

Synonyms
- Agaricus californiensis Berk. & M.A.Curtis (1860); Mycena elegantula Peck (1895)

= Mycena californiensis =

Species of fungus

Mycena californiensis
- Mycological characteristics
- Gills on hymenium
- Cap is conical or campanulate
- Hymenium is adnate
- Stipe is bare
- Spore print is white
- Ecology is saprotrophic
- Edibility is unknown

Mycena californiensis is a species of fungus in the family Mycenaceae. It is a common and abundant species in the coastal oak woodlands of California, where it grows saprobically, feeding on the fallen leaves and acorns of various oak species. First described in 1860 by Berkeley and Curtis, the species was collected four years earlier during an exploring and surveying expedition. It was subsequently considered a doubtful species by later Mycena researchers, until a 1999 publication validated the taxon. Mycena elegantula is considered a synonym.

Making their appearance in late autumn to early winter, the small and fragile fruit bodies are characterized by reddish-brown tones in the cap, stem, and the edges of the gills. If cut, the mushroom tissue will "bleed" a deep reddish to orangish latex. As is typical of the genus Mycena, caps of M. californiensis are bluntly conical, becoming bell-shaped to convex, and eventually flatten out when old. They measure up to 2 cm (0.8 in) in diameter, and are attached to thin, hollow stems that are up to 13 cm (5.1 in) long.

== Taxonomy ==
Botanist Charles Wright collected the first reported specimen.

The species was originally collected for science purposes by the American botanist Charles Wright during the North Pacific Exploring and Surveying Expedition of 1853–56. The single collection was found growing on fallen oak leaves at Mare Island Naval Shipyard, in Solano County, California in January 1856. The specimen was sent by American mycologist Moses Ashley Curtis to his British colleague Miles Joseph Berkeley, who published a brief description of the species in 1860, calling it Agaricus californiensis, in what was then the subgenus Mycena. Berkeley and Curtis noted that it differed from A. aurantio-marginatus (known today as Mycena aurantiomarginata) in the nature of the gills, and they called it "a more graceful species". In his 1887 Sylloge Fungorum, Pier Andrea Saccardo raised the subgenus Mycena to generic status, so the species became known as Mycena californiensis.

In his 1947 monograph of North American Mycena, Alexander H. Smith included it as an "excluded or doubtful species", saying that the species "cannot be recognized until the microscopic characters of the type are known." Researching his 1982 monograph of Mycena, Maas Geesteranus examined the holotype material—the particular specimen designated by Berkeley and Curtis to represent the type of the species. Because of its deteriorated condition, however, he was unable to corroborate the distinguishing features proposed by Berkeley and Curtis, and he agreed with Smith's assessment of the species.

In the late 1990s, as part of his studies on the Mycena of California, Brian Perry noted that a common species in California, usually referred to as Mycena elegantula or M. sanguinolenta, presented characteristics not congruent with either (in particular, M. elegantula had not previously been reported to contain latex). He compared isotype material (material collected at the same time and place as the holotype) of M. californiensis with Californian specimens and the type of M. elegantula and found all of them to represent the same species, publishing the results with Dennis Desjardin in their 1999 Mycotaxon article "Mycena californiensis resurrected". Part of the confusion, they noted, was apparently due to Smith's concept of M. elegantula not agreeing with the species' type (something also noticed by Geesteranus).

Because M. californiensis is the earlier name (published in 1860 vs. 1895 for Mycena elegantula), it has priority over the later name M. elegantula, according to the rules of botanical nomenclature.

== Description ==
The cap is initially conic or bell-shaped, but flattens out in maturity, and typically reaches dimensions of up to 2 cm (3/4 in). The cap margins (edges) are curved inwards when young, but as they age they become wavy or crenate (with rounded scallops), develop striations (radial grooves) and may even split. The surface of the cap is dull and smooth. Its color ranges from reddish brown to brownish orange in young specimens, with the color fading as the mushroom matures; the center of the cap is usually darker than the margins. The flesh is thin, and either the same color as the cap or lighter; it may stain a dark red color when bruised.

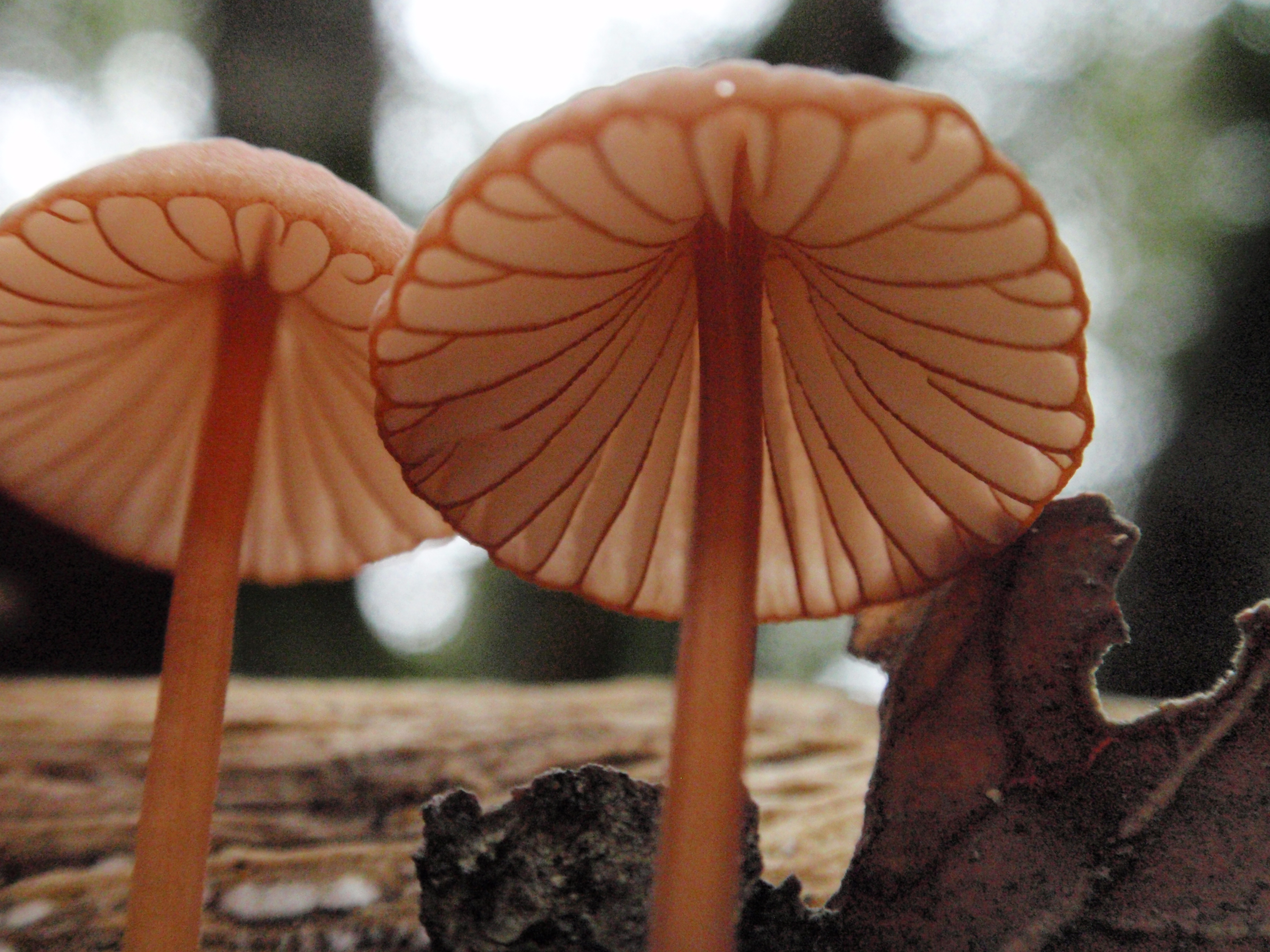
The white to light pink gills have darker-colored edges.

The gills have an adnate attachment to the stem—broadly attached slightly above the bottom of the gill, with most of the gill fused to the stem. They are not closely spaced together, and there are about 15–20 of them. Some of the gills do not extend the full distance from the edge of the cap to the stem. These short gills, called lamellulae, form one to two groups of roughly equal length. All of the gills have a white to pinkish-buff color, with the gill edges ranging from reddish orange to reddish brown to brownish orange. The hollow stem is 3–13 cm (1 1/4–5 in) long and 1–3 mm (1/16–1/8 in) thick, and roughly the same thickness throughout. The top of the stem may be either pruinose (appearing to be covered with a very fine whitish powder on a surface) or smooth, while the stem base is covered with "hairs" that may be strigose (large, coarse, and bristle-like) to downy (soft and fuzzy). The stem is some shade of brown. The mushroom tissue will "bleed" a brownish-range to reddish-brown latex when it is cut. The edibility of M. californiensis is unknown.

=== Microscopic characteristics ===
In deposit, such as with a spore print, the spores appear white. Further details are revealed with a light microscope: the spores are ellipsoid to almond-shaped, smooth, thin-walled, and measure 8–12 by 4–6 μm. The basidia (the spore-bearing cells) are club-shaped, four-spored, and typically have dimensions of 26–37.5 by 7–10.5 μm. M. californiensis has cheilocystidia (cystidia on the gill edges) that measure 16–50 by 6.5–20 μm. These cells have irregular projections that can range in size from 1.5 to 18.8 by 1.5–6.5 μm and are variously shaped, from knob-like to cylindrical. The cells contain brownish contents that will stain darkly with Melzer's reagent, a common chemical reagent used in mushroom identification. With the exception of the medullary hyphae of the stem (longitudinally-arranged hyphae making up the stem surface), all hyphae contain clamp connections.

=== Similar species ===
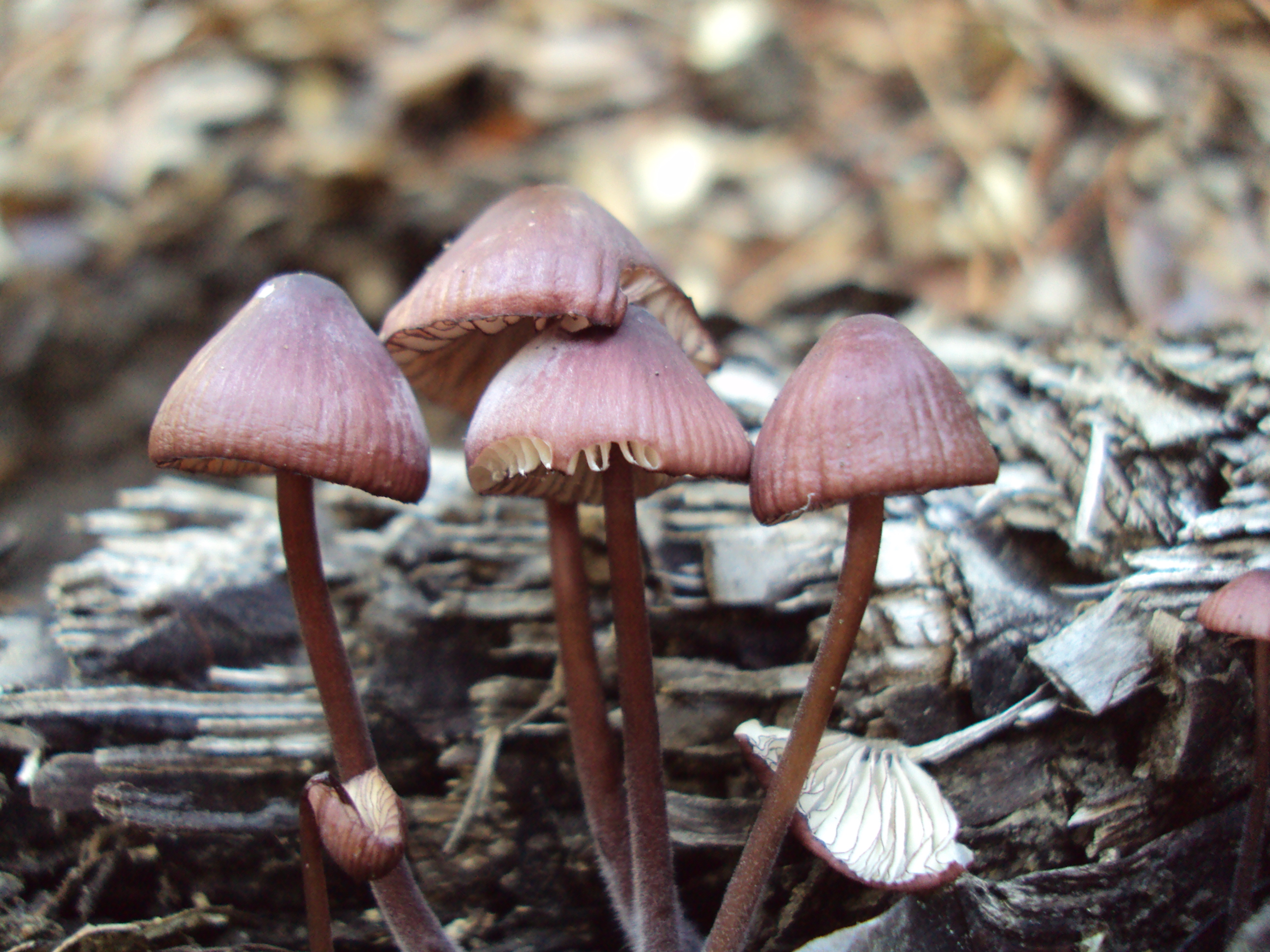
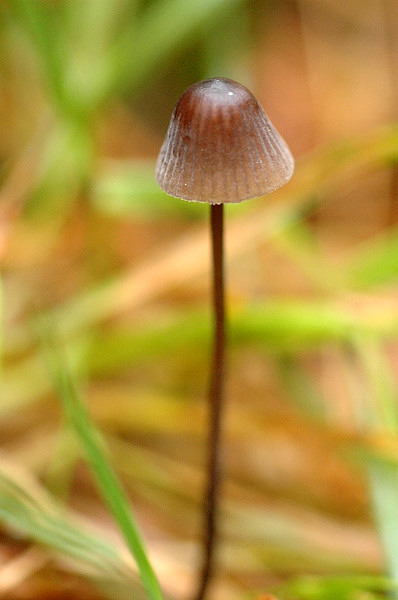
Potential lookalike species include M. purpureofusca (left) and M. sanguinolenta (right)

Mycena californiensis may be distinguished from the closely related M. atromarginata by its smaller size and the purplish tint to the edge of the gills, and from M. purpureofusca by its differently shaped, longer spores. Another Mycena commonly confused with M. californiensis is M. sanguinolenta, a species that also exudes reddish latex. It can be distinguished from M. californiensis by the fusiform (tapering at each end) cheilocystidia that do not have outgrowths. An additional difference between the two is that M. sanguinolenta is associated with conifer wood and debris.

== Habitat and distribution ==
The fruit bodies grow in clusters or scattered on the decomposing leaves and acorns of oak trees, such as Coast Live Oak, Valley Oak and Black Oak. It is common in the coastal oak woodlands of California, where it appears from late autumn to early winter.
