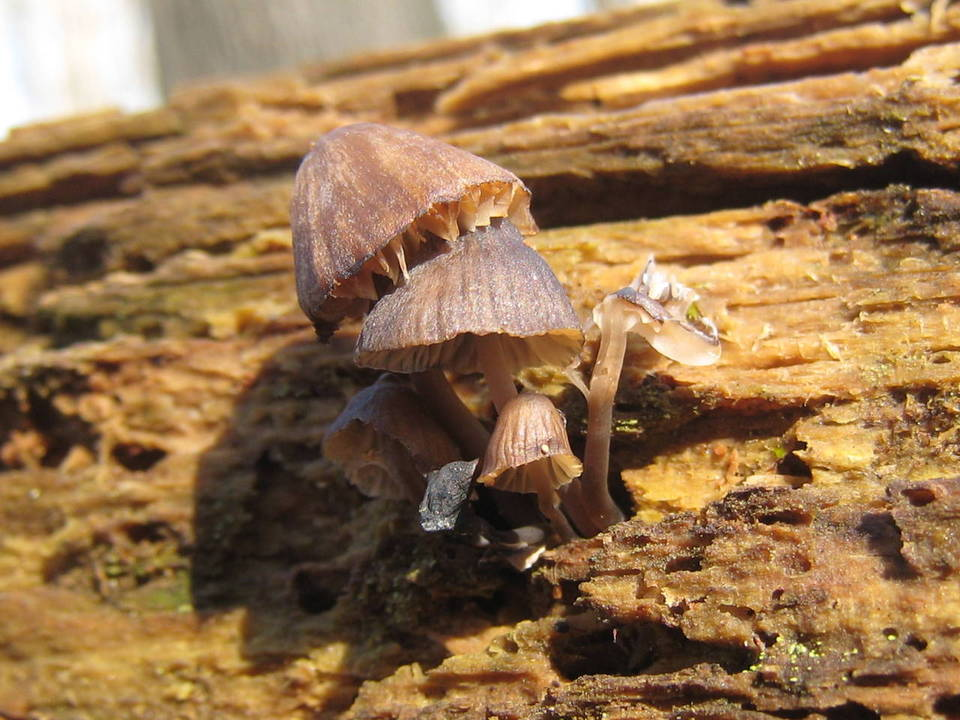

Scientific classification
- Domain: Eukaryota
- Kingdom: Fungi
- Division: Basidiomycota
- Class: Agaricomycetes
- Order: Agaricales
- Family: Mycenaceae
- Genus: Mycena
- Species: M. alcalina

Binomial name
- Mycena alcalina (Pers.) Gillet

= Mycena alcalina =

Species of fungus

Mycena alcalina Mycological characteristics
- Gills on hymenium
- Cap is conical
- Hymenium is adnate
- Stipe is bare
- Spore print is white
- Ecology is saprotrophic
- Edibility is edible, but unpalatable

Mycena alcalina, commonly known as the alkaline mycena, or stump fairy helmet mushroom, is a species of fungus in the family Mycenaceae. It grows widely, ranging from North America to Europe.

== Taxonomy ==
Mycena is a genus of saprotrophic mushroom. The name "Mycena" comes from the Ancient Greek μύκης, or mykes, meaning "mushroom." It is characterized by a white/grey spore print, small conical (bell-shaped) cap, and very thin stem. Species found in the genus Mycena are typically known as bonnets.

== Description ==
The cap ranges from conical to bell shaped and is generally 1–4 cm in diameter. The cap is supported by a thin, hollow stem growing anywhere from 20–65mm long. The cap appears black at first, but fades to a grey-brown colour around the edges, with the stem generally being the same colour as the cap. The flesh of ranges from white to translucent and is fragile and thin. The mushroom is edible, but has a mild acrid taste and distinct bleach-like odour, making it unpleasant to eat.

== Habitat and distribution ==
Mycena alcalina is saprotrophic, meaning it derives nutrients from the breakdown of organic materials through use of extracellular enzymes. This particular species is found most often growing on the wood of coniferous trees. It can typically be found growing during the early summer and fall. Its geography is fairly widespread, being found in both North America and Europe. In North America, it grows predominately on the western coast. It can be found in habitats ranging from the old growth forests of British Columbia, throughout Washington and Oregon. It can also be found in other states, including Montana, Idaho, Maryland and Virginia. It is also found throughout Europe, generally growing in densely forested areas including Britain, Finland, the Netherlands, Norway and Spain.

== Mycoremediation ==
Mycoremediation, a form of bioremediation, is the process of using fungi to degrade or sequester contaminants in the environment. Some types of fungi are hyperaccumulators capable of absorbing and concentrating heavy metals within the fruiting bodies. Some mushrooms produce large amounts of extracellular enzymes, which break down the toxins and render them inert or less dangerous. In the case of M. alcalina, it is believed that the bleach-like odor is due to this species' ability to break down chlorinated compounds. Recent research also indicates that it has the ability to break down brominated compounds.
