= Pterulone =

Names
- Preferred IUPAC name 1-[(3Z)-3-(Chloromethylidene)-2,3-dihydro-1-benzoxepin-7-yl]ethan-1-one

Identifiers
CAS Number	369376-61-4
3D model (JSmol)	Interactive image
ChEMBL	ChEMBL450490
ChemSpider	9599722
PubChem CID	11424846
UNII	A69767WW45
- InChI: InChI=1S/C13H11ClO2/c1-9(15)11-4-5-13-12(6-11)3-2-10(7-14)8-16-13/h2-7H,8H2,1H3/b10-7- Key: QEWSARCWWQPUSM-YFHOEESVSA-N; InChI=1S/C13H11ClO2/c1-9(15)11-4-5-13-12(6-11)3-2-10(7-14)8-16-13/h2-7H,8H2,1H3/b10-7-; InChI=1S/C13H11ClO2/c1-9(15)11-4-5-13-12(6-11)3-2-10(7-14)8-16-13/h2-7H,8H2,1H3/b10-7- Key: QEWSARCWWQPUSM-YFHOEESVSA-N
- SMILES: O=C(c2ccc1OCC(/C=C\c1c2)=[C@H]Cl)C

Properties
Chemical formula	C_{13}H_{11}ClO_{2}
Molar mass	234.678
- Except where otherwise noted, data are given for materials in their standard state (at 25 °C [77 °F], 100 kPa). verify (what is ?) Infobox references

Pterulone is a fungal metabolite. It was initially isolated from the mycelium and liquid cultures of wood-decay fungus in the genus Pterula. The compound inhibits eukaryotic respiration by targeting the mitochondrial NADH:ubiquinone oxidoreductase.
