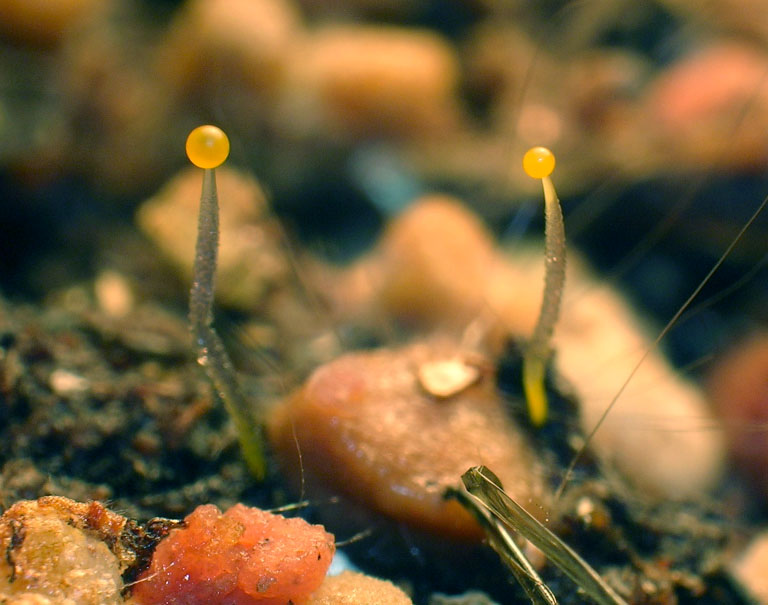
- Phycomyces sp. growing from fish pellet in potting soil

Scientific classification
- Kingdom: Fungi
- Division: Mucoromycota
- Class: Mucoromycetes
- Order: Mucorales
- Family: Phycomycetaceae; Arx (1982)

Type genus
- Phycomyces Kunze (1823)

Genera
- Phycomyces; Spinellus

= Phycomycetaceae =

Family of fungi

The Phycomycetaceae are a family of fungi in the order Mucorales. Species in this family are widespread, but more common in temperate areas. The family was circumscribed in 1982 by J. Arx.

== Description ==
Members of this family have large, unbranched sporangiophores and zygospores with coiled tong-like suspensors bearing branched appendages.
