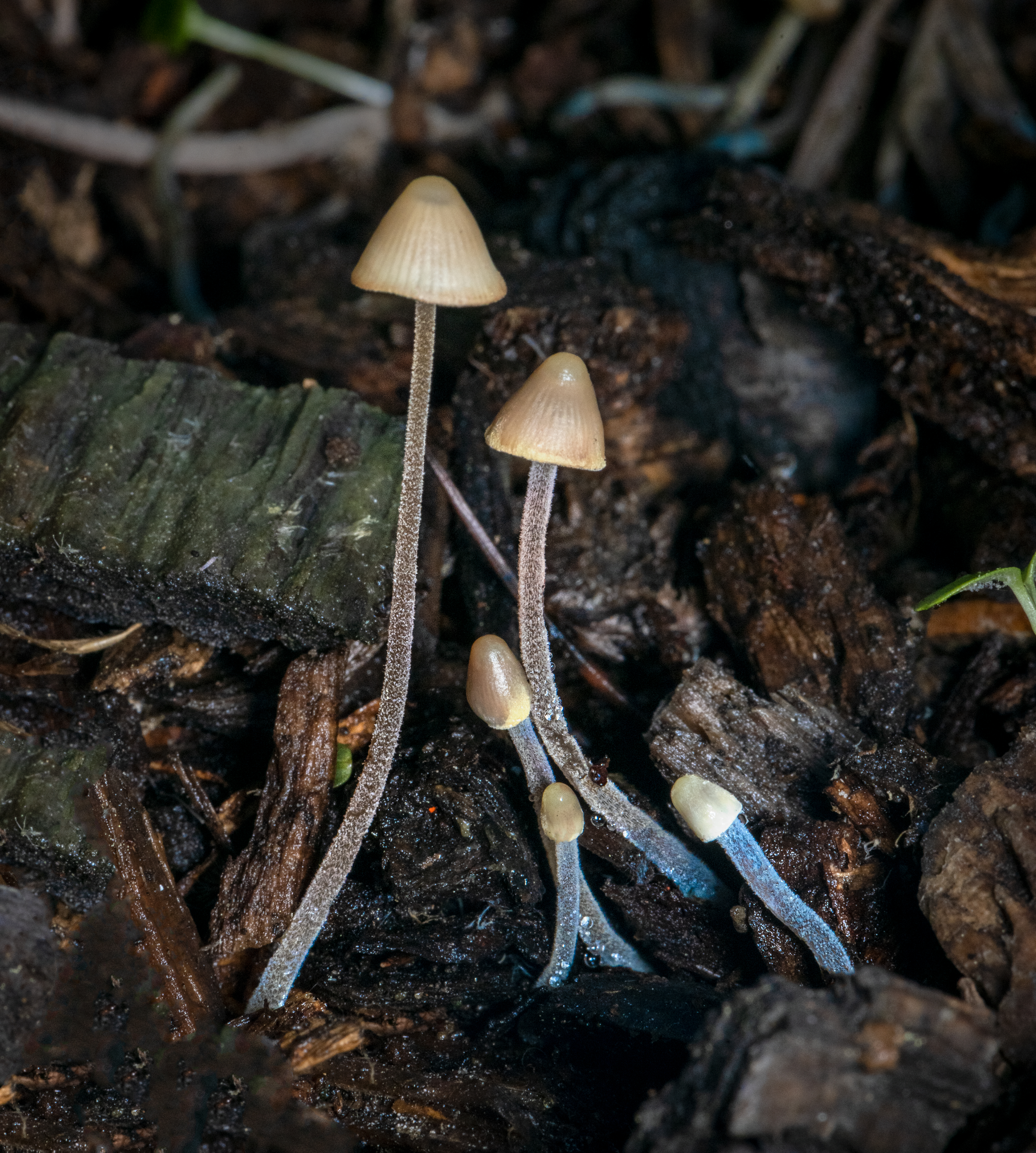
- Mycena amicta

Scientific classification
- Kingdom: Fungi
- Division: Basidiomycota
- Class: Agaricomycetes
- Order: Agaricales
- Family: Mycenaceae
- Genus: Mycena (Pers.) Roussel (1806)

Type species
- Mycena galericulata (Scop.) Gray (1821)

= Mycena =

Genus of fungi

Mycena is a genus of about 500 species of fungi.

Rarely more than a few centimeters in width, the mushrooms are characterized by a small conical or bell-shaped cap and a thin fragile stem. Most are grey or brown, but a few species have brighter colours. Most have a translucent and striate cap, which rarely has an incurved margin. The gills are attached and usually have cystidia. Some species, like M. haematopus, exude a latex when the stem is broken, and many species have a chlorine or radish-like odour. They produce a white spore print.

The species are saprotrophic. Their edibility varies, with some members containing toxins.

== Taxonomy ==
Mycena is a rich genus, considered one of the most abundant genera of mushrooms within the Agaricales and with species distributed across the world.

Alexander Smith's 1947 Mycena monograph identified 232 species; the genus is now known to include about 500 species worldwide. Maas Geesteranus divided the genus into 38 sections in 1992, providing keys to each for all the species of the Northern Hemisphere.

Many new species have since been discovered, and four new sections have been proposed. The taxonomy is complex, as most sections are not truly homogeneous, and the keys fail for some species, especially those that satisfy some criteria for only part of their life cycle. Some sections contain only one species.

The genus Basidopus Earle, originally described in 1909 and long treated as a synonym of Mycena, was reinstated in 2025 on the basis of phylogenetic evidence. Several species formerly placed in Mycena, including M. amicta, M. cyanorhiza, M. stylobates, M. tenerrima and M. chlorophos, were recombined into Basidopus.

=== Selected species ===
- M. abramsii
- M. acicula
- M. adscendens
- M. aetites
- M. albidocapillaris
- M. alcalina
- M. alnicola
- M. alphitophora
- M. amicta
- M. atkinsonii
- M. atkinsoniana
- M. aurantiomarginata
- M. austrofilopes
- M. austrororida
- M. arcangeliana
- M. aspratilis (bioluminescent)
- M. asterina (bioluminescent)
- M. atrata
- M. brunneospinosa
- M. cahaya (bioluminescent)
- M. californiensis
- M. capillaripes
- M. chlorophos (bioluminescent)
- M. chlorophanos (bioluminescent)
- M. cinerella
- M. citricolor
- M. citrinomarginata
- M. clariviolacea
- M. clarkeana
- M. coralliformis (bioluminescent)
- M. cristinae (bioluminescent)
- M. crocata
- M. cyanorrhiza
- M. cystidiosa
- M. daisyogunensis (bioluminescent)
- M. deeptha (bioluminescent)
- M. deformis (bioluminescent)
- M. deusta (bioluminescent)
- M. discobasis (bioluminescent)
- M. domingensis
- M. epipterygia (bioluminescent)
- M. erubescens
- M. fera (bioluminescent)
- M. flavescens
- M. flavoalba
- M. fonticola
- M. fuhreri
- M. fulgoris (bioluminescent)
- M. fusca (bioluminescent)
- M. fuscoaurantiaca
- M. galericulata
- M. galopus (bioluminescent)
- M. griseoviridis
- M. globulispora (bioluminescent)
- M. gombakensis (bioluminescent)
- M. guldeniana
- M. guzmanii (bioluminescent)
- M. haematopus (bioluminescent)
- M. holoporphyra
- M. illuminans (bioluminescent)
- M. inclinata (bioluminescent)
- M. indigotica
- M. interrupta
- M. intersecta
- M. kentingensis (bioluminescent)
- M. kuurkacea
- M. lacrimans (bioluminescent)
- M. lazulina (bioluminescent)
- M. leaiana
- M. lacrimans (bioluminescent)
- M. lanuginosa
- M. leptocephala
- M. lucentipes (bioluminescent)
- M. lumina (bioluminescent)
- M. luteopallens
- M. luxaeterna (bioluminescent)
- M. luxarboricola (bioluminescent)
- M. lux-coeli (bioluminescent)
- M. luxfoliata (bioluminescent)
- M. luxfoliicola (bioluminescent)
- M. luxperpetua (bioluminescent)
- M. maculata (bioluminescent)
- M. margarita (bioluminescent)
- M. marasmielloides
- M. mariae
- M. metata
- M. minirubra
- M. multiplicata
- M. mustea
- M. nargan
- M. nebula (bioluminescent)
- M. nidificata
- M. nocticaelum (bioluminescent)
- M. noctilucens
- M. oculisnymphae (bioluminescent)
- M. olida
- M. olivaceomarginata (bioluminescent)
- M. oregonensis
- M. overholtsii
- M. perlae (bioluminescent)
- M. pelianthina
- M. polygramma (bioluminescent)
- M. pruinosoviscida (bioluminescent)
- M. pseudostylobates (bioluminescent)
- M. pura (bioluminescent)
- M. pura complex
- M. purpureofusca
- M. renati
- M. rosea (bioluminescent)
- M. rosella
- M. roseoflava (bioluminescent)
- M. sanguinolenta (bioluminescent)
- M. seminau (bioluminescent)
- M. semivestipes
- M. seynesii
- M. silvaelucens (bioluminescent)
- M. sinar (bioluminescent)
- M. sinar var. tangkaisinar (bioluminescent)
- M. singeri (bioluminescent)
- M. spinosissima
- M. stipata
- M. strobilinoides
- M. stylobates (bioluminescent)
- M. subcaerulea
- M. subcyanocephala
- M. sublucens (bioluminescent)
- M. tenuispinosa
- M. tintinnabulum (bioluminescent)
- M. urania
- M. vinacea (bioluminescent)
- M. viscosa
- M. vitilis
- M. vulgaris
- M. zephirus (bioluminescent)

=== Etymology ===
The name Mycena comes from the Ancient Greek μύκης mykes, meaning "fungus". Species in the genus Mycena (and in Hemimycena) are commonly known as bonnets.

Mycena sp.
- Mycological characteristics
- Gills on hymenium
- Cap is conical
- Hymenium is adnate
- Stipe is bare
- Spore print is white
- Ecology is saprotrophic
- Edibility is unknown

== Description ==
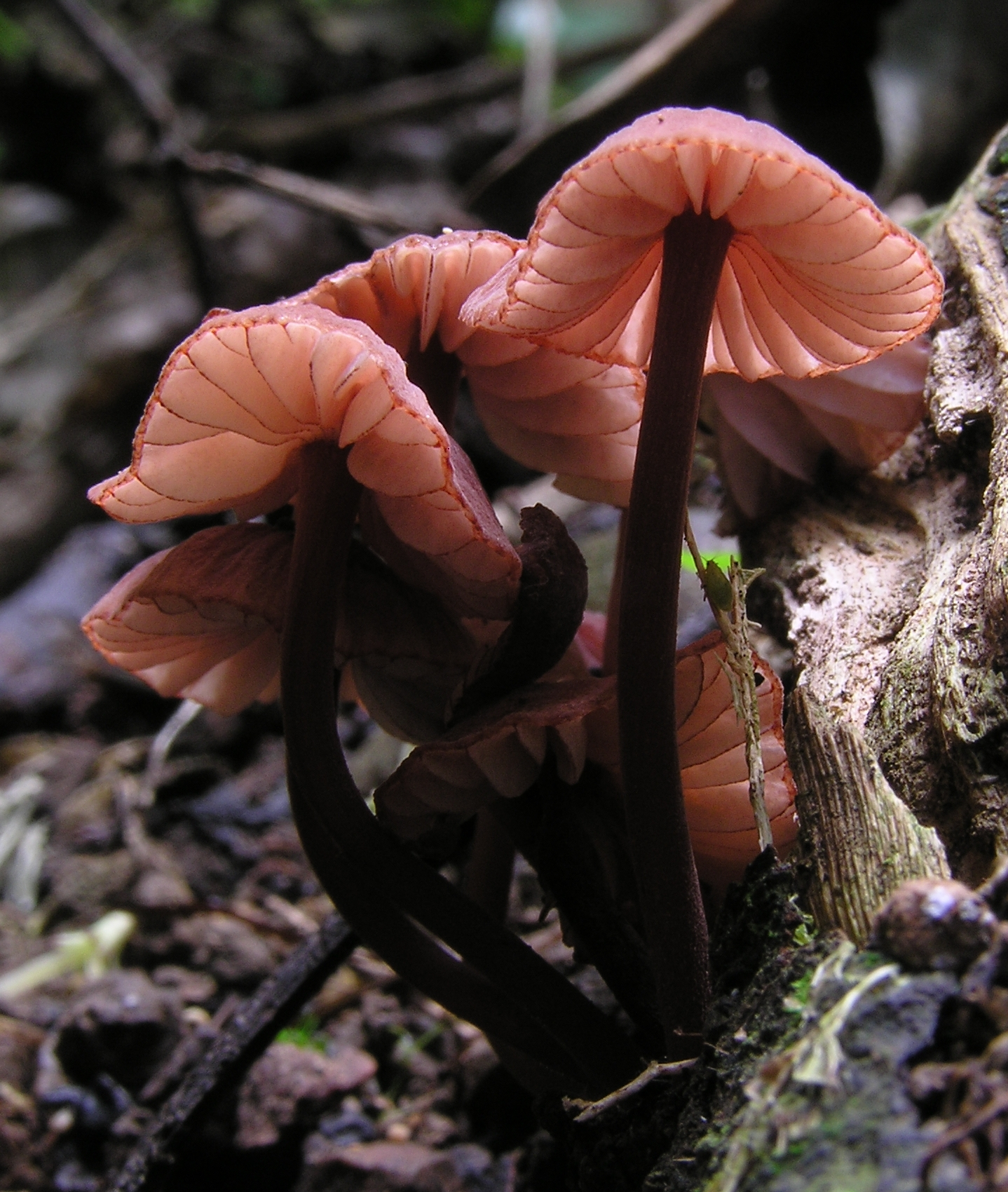
Mycena rubroglobulosa, New Zealand

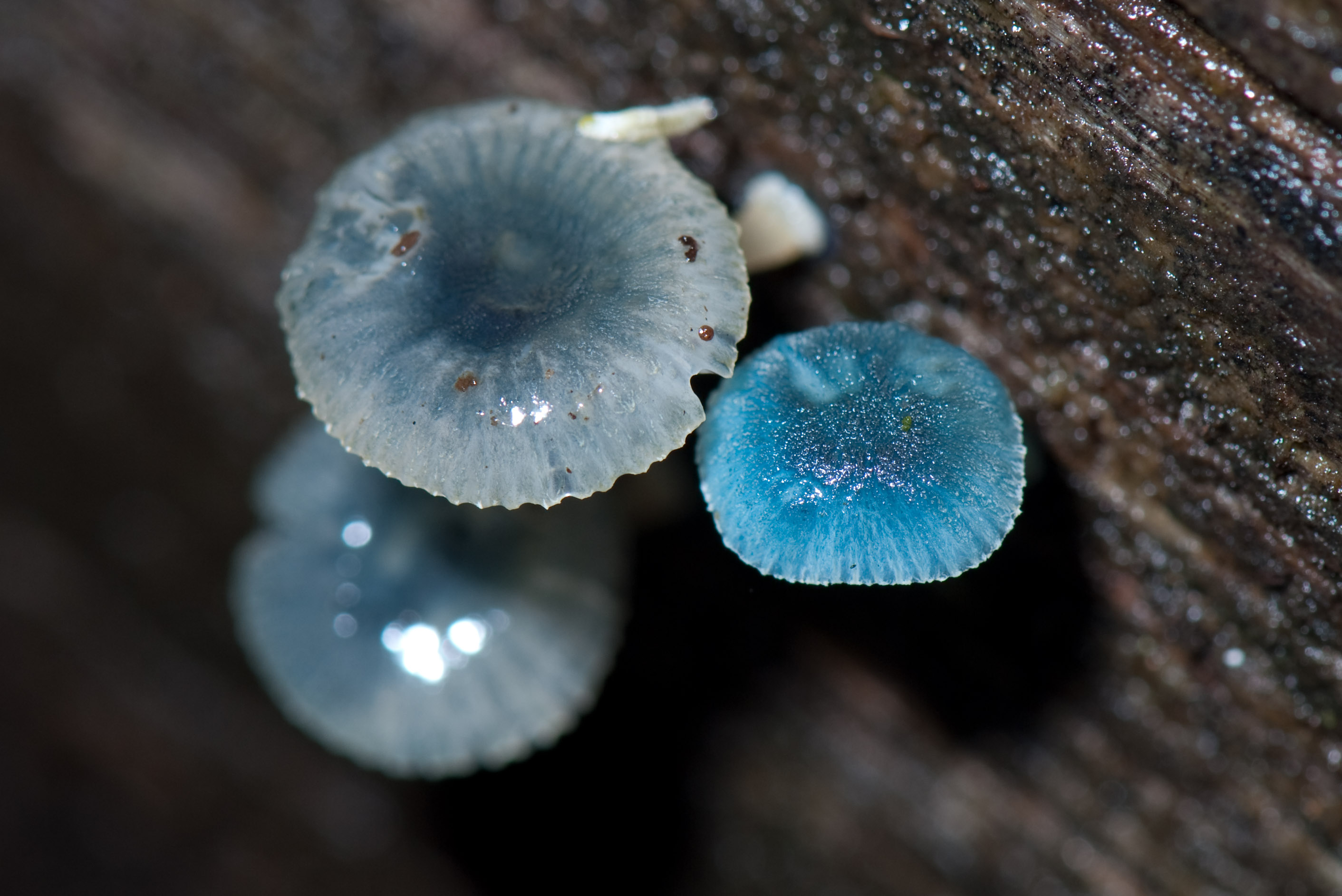
The blue M. interrupta (pixies' parasol) growing on a log in Australia

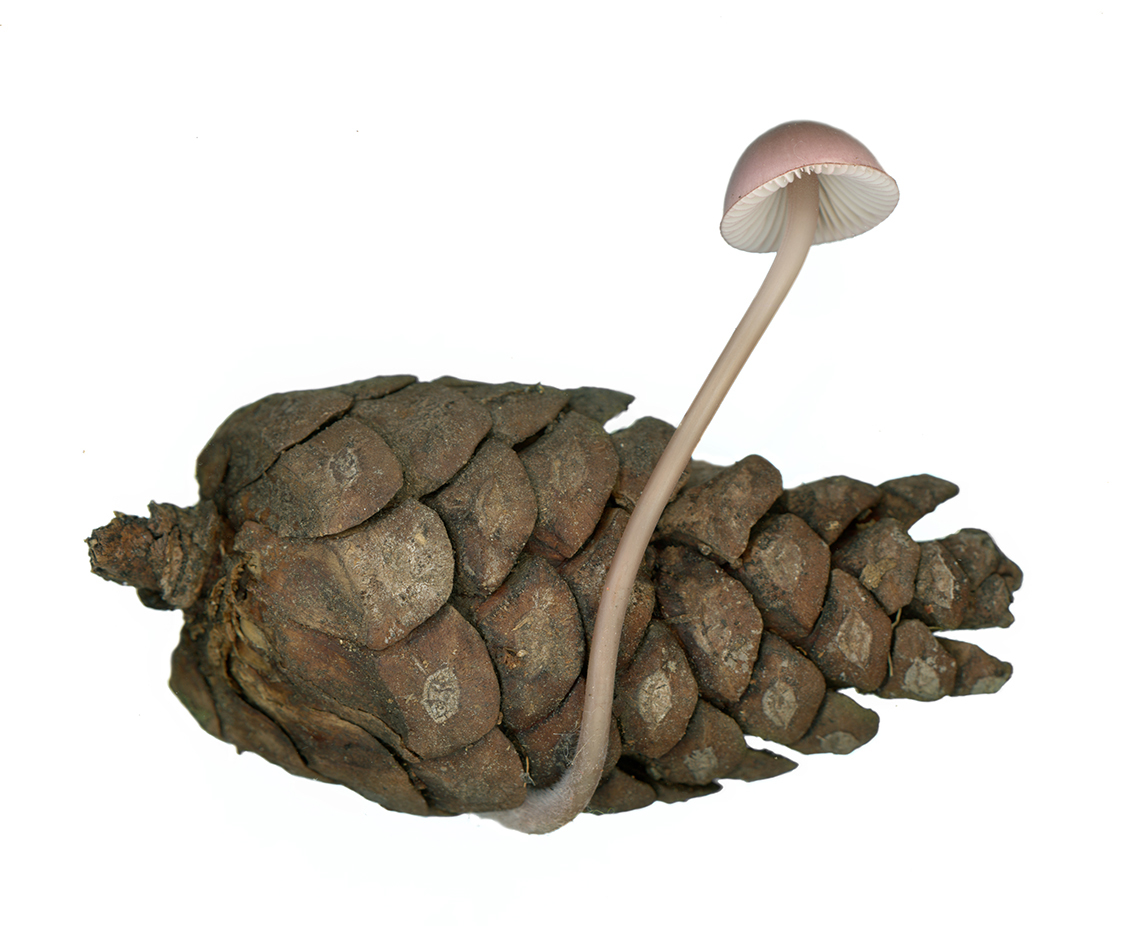
Mycena seynesii

Mycenas are hard to identify to species and some are distinguishable only by microscopic features such as the shape of the cystidia. In terms of morphology, Mycena mushrooms are notably minute in their size (anywhere from 0.5 to ~15 cm in cap-size). Pileate-stipitate in form, there can exist a wide range in both the anatomical characteristics and color of the basidiocarps—though most often basidiocarps are grey or brown. Veils and volva presence in the morphology is not observed. The hymenium is most often either lamellate or poroid, dependent upon the species. Spores are smooth and can be amyloid or non-amyloid, also dependent upon the species. Some species also secrete a latex-like fluid when damaged at the base of the stem.

Over 58 species are known to be bioluminescent, creating a glow known as foxfire. These species are divided among 16 lineages, leading to evolutionary uncertainty in whether the luminescence developed once and was lost among many species, or evolved in parallel by several species. One advantage of bioluminescence may lie in its potential to attract insects that can disperse the mushroom's spores.

Bioluminescence in the genus occurs as a reaction between oxygen and luciferin molecules catalyzed by the enzyme luciferase. In recent years, mycologists have conducted research examining the development of bioluminescence within fungi, investigating the origin of the genes coding for luciferase enzymes that cause these fantastic visible traits. So far, the literature suggests 3 separate origins of bioluminescence within Agaricales, occurring within the families Omphalotaceae, Physalacriaceae, and Mycenaceae.

== Ecology ==
Traditionally, the group has been thought to play a purely saprotrophic role in the environment, mostly occurring on hardwoods and producing white rots—though it should be mentioned that, as of 2008, some plant pathogens had also been discovered. Additionally, it is also worth noting that, in a 2020 study, Thoen et al. challenges the traditional view that the genus has only a saprobic ecological role, suggesting instead that the ability of Mycena to form plant root interactions in vitro may indicate the capability to establish ectomycorrhizal relationships with a host.

Recent discoveries show that Mycena can not only grow from a rotting wood, but also from a living plant root (2023) and a living frog (2024).

== Uses ==
Some species are edible, while others contain toxins, but the edibility of most is not known, as they are likely too small to be useful in cooking. Mycena pura and M. rosea contain the mycotoxin muscarine, but the medical significance of this is unknown.

== See also ==
- List of bioluminescent fungi
- Mycena News, a publication of the Mycological Society of San Francisco
