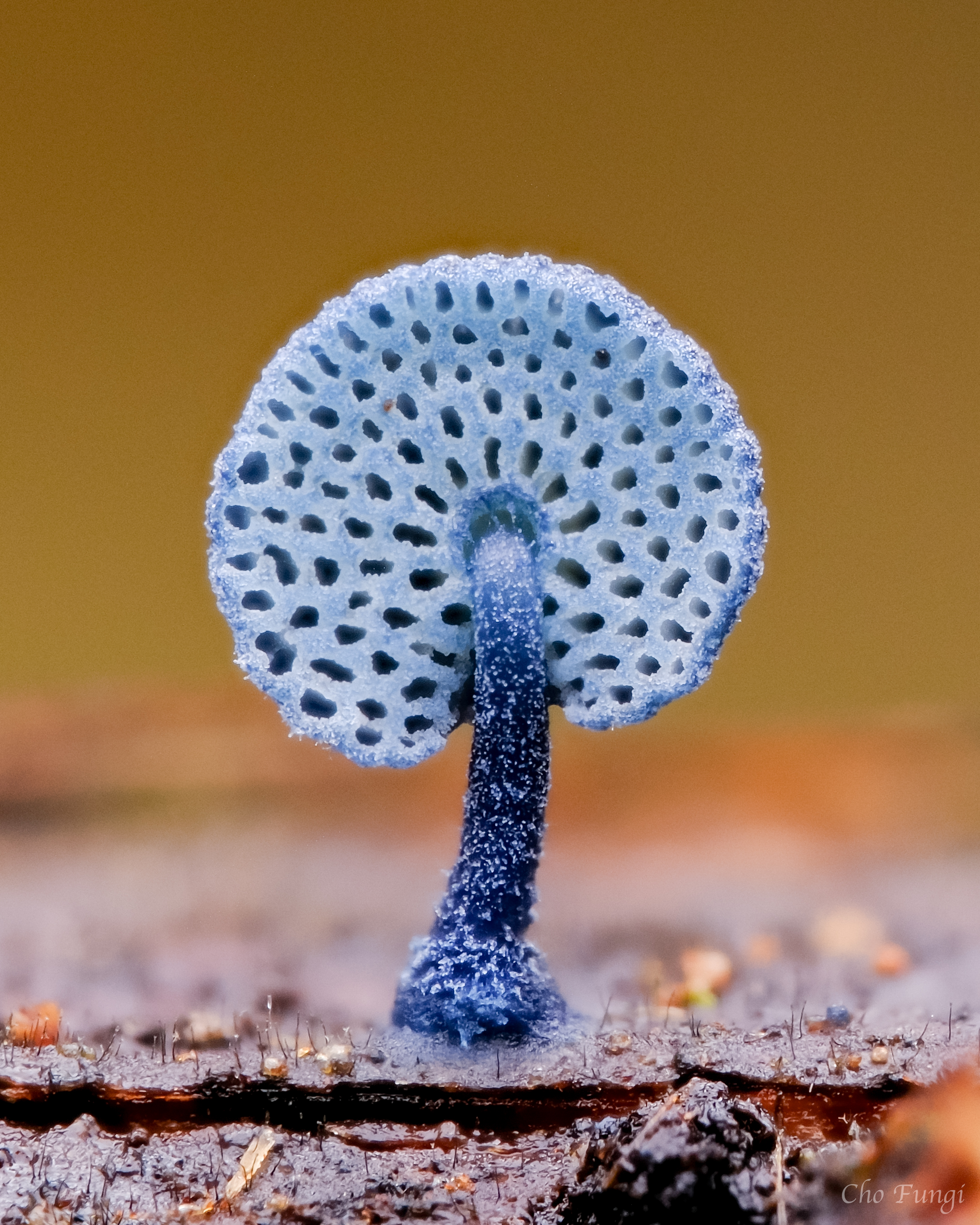

Scientific classification
- Kingdom: Fungi
- Division: Basidiomycota
- Class: Agaricomycetes
- Order: Agaricales
- Family: Mycenaceae
- Genus: Mycena
- Species: M. indigotica

Binomial name
- Mycena indigotica C.L.Wei & R.Kirschner (2018)

= Mycena indigotica =

Species of fungus

Mycena indigotica is a species of fungus. It was described for the first time in 2018 by Chia Ling Wei and Roland Kirschner after its discovery on the North-western Pacific Island of Taiwan. The genus Mycena is most famous for containing the majority of described bioluminescent fungi. However, M. indigotica is one of the many non-bioluminescent species within the genus. Nonetheless, this mushroom is aesthetically striking, with a petite and novel morphology.

== Taxonomy and phylogeny ==
Mycena indigotica was first described by Wei and Kirschner from Taiwan in 2019, making it a relatively newly described species. The specific epithet "indigotica" is a homage to the historical industry of indigo dying in Taiwan. The closet relative is purported to be Mycena illuminans. This is interesting and worth consideration, as M. illuminans possesses bioluminescence traits while M. indigotica does not. It is possible that the species exhibits cryptic bioluminescent traits, something that has been noted in other Mycena species before. What is more likely to have occurred however, is a loss of function within the luciferase producing genes of the species. This is supported in a recent study where M. indigotica was used in a to describe the origin of bioluminescence in fungal species. M. indigotica was selected for its lack of apparent bioluminescent features. Results from the study support the idea that M. indigotica lost the entirety of the luciferase gene cluster from its genome.

== Morphology ==
Morphologically the species is quite striking. The following is an excerpt from the descriptive paper on the species:

"Basidiomata gregarious, not luminescent. Pileus 1.5-3.5 mm diam, at first semiglobose, then convex to flattened, non-striate, pale blue… to blue…when young, gradually with black tints with age, totally black when old or in dried specimens, slightly pruinose when young, glabrous with age, context white, margin entire, crenulate. Hymenophore consisting of 70-120 pores, pores circular, usually oval near stipe, concolorous with surface of pileus, 8-12 pores per mm. Stipe 2e4 x 0.5e1 mm, blue…to dark blue…gradually with black tints with age, pruinose when young, glabrous with age, cylindrical, central, basally bulbous".

Additionally, the basidiospore morphology is globose to ellipisoid. Multiple cystidia cell types are reported (cheilo-, pleuro-, and caulo-), which is an important feature for identification of many Mycena individuals to species. Exceptional illustrations of microscopic features can be found within the descriptive paper. From available pictures, the species seems to invert the pilus and expose the hymenium, possibly a method for more efficient spore dispersal.

== Ecology ==
Ecologically, the species seems to be a saprotrophic wood decaying fungus, which is in concordance with the majority of other species in the genus. The species was observed on a substrate of fallen Calamus sp. These were located within the lowland valleys of Taiwan near the city of New Taipei. The fungus was observed in all seasons except for the winter. This may suggest the utilization of survival structures by the genus that have not yet been noted or that this species fruits preferentially during warm weather. This species is currently only known from Northern Taiwan. The closest purported relative M. illuminans was originally collected on the Indonesian island of Java, a significant distance away from Taiwan (> 2000 miles).
