= Mycena marasmielloides =

Scientific classification
- Domain: Eukaryota
- Kingdom: Fungi
- Division: Basidiomycota
- Class: Agaricomycetes
- Order: Agaricales
- Family: Mycenaceae
- Genus: Mycena
- Species: M. marasmielloides

Binomial name
- Mycena marasmielloides Desjardin & Hemmes (2011)
- Known only from Hawaii

Species of fungus

Mycena marasmielloides is a species of agaric fungus in the family Mycenaceae. Newly described to science in 2011, it is known only from Hawaiian montane wet forests. The species produces tiny mushrooms with pale brown to grayish caps up to 5 mm in diameter, held by thin curved stems up to 4 mm long.

== Taxonomy ==
The species was discovered in May 1993, by Dennis Desjardins, in Hawaiʻi Volcanoes National Park, Puʻu Makaʻala, on the eastern flank of Mauna Loa, and collected later at the same location. The specific epithet marasmielloides means "resembling Marasmiellus", and refers to the similarity of the fruit body with those from that genus. Desjardins and Hemmes consider the species best classified in section Supinae of the genus Mycena, and suggest that it is closely allied with Mycena fera and Mycena globulispora.

== Description ==
The fruit bodies have caps that are convex to bell-shaped, and measure 1–5 mm in diameter. The moist caps are radially grooved, have a suede or felt-like texture, and are colored light brown to orangish, typically fading in maturity. The attachment of the gills to the stem ranges from adnate (broadly attached) to adnexed (narrowly attached), and they are distantly spaced, with 6–9 gills extending fully from the stem to the edge of the cap. The slender stem is 2–4 mm long by 0.1–0.2 mm thick, and roughly the same width throughout its length. The stem is dry, often curved, light brown to greyish in color, and the base is insititious (attached squarely to the substrate without any evidence of basal mycelium). The fruit bodies have no distinctive taste or odor.

In deposit, the spores are white. The spores are spherical or nearly so, hyaline (translucent), thin-walled, and typically measure 9–10.2 by 8–9 μm. The basidia (spore-bearing cells) are broadly club-shaped, four-spored, and measure 28–35 by 14–16 μm.

== Habitat and distribution ==
Mycena marasmielloides is saprobic, and grows scattered or in groups on dead or dying rachises (the main shaft of a fern frond) of the endemic Hawaiian tree fern Hāpuʻu pulu (Cibotium glaucum) in Ohiʻa/Hapuʻu Tree Fern Forest. It is endemic to Hawaiʻi.
