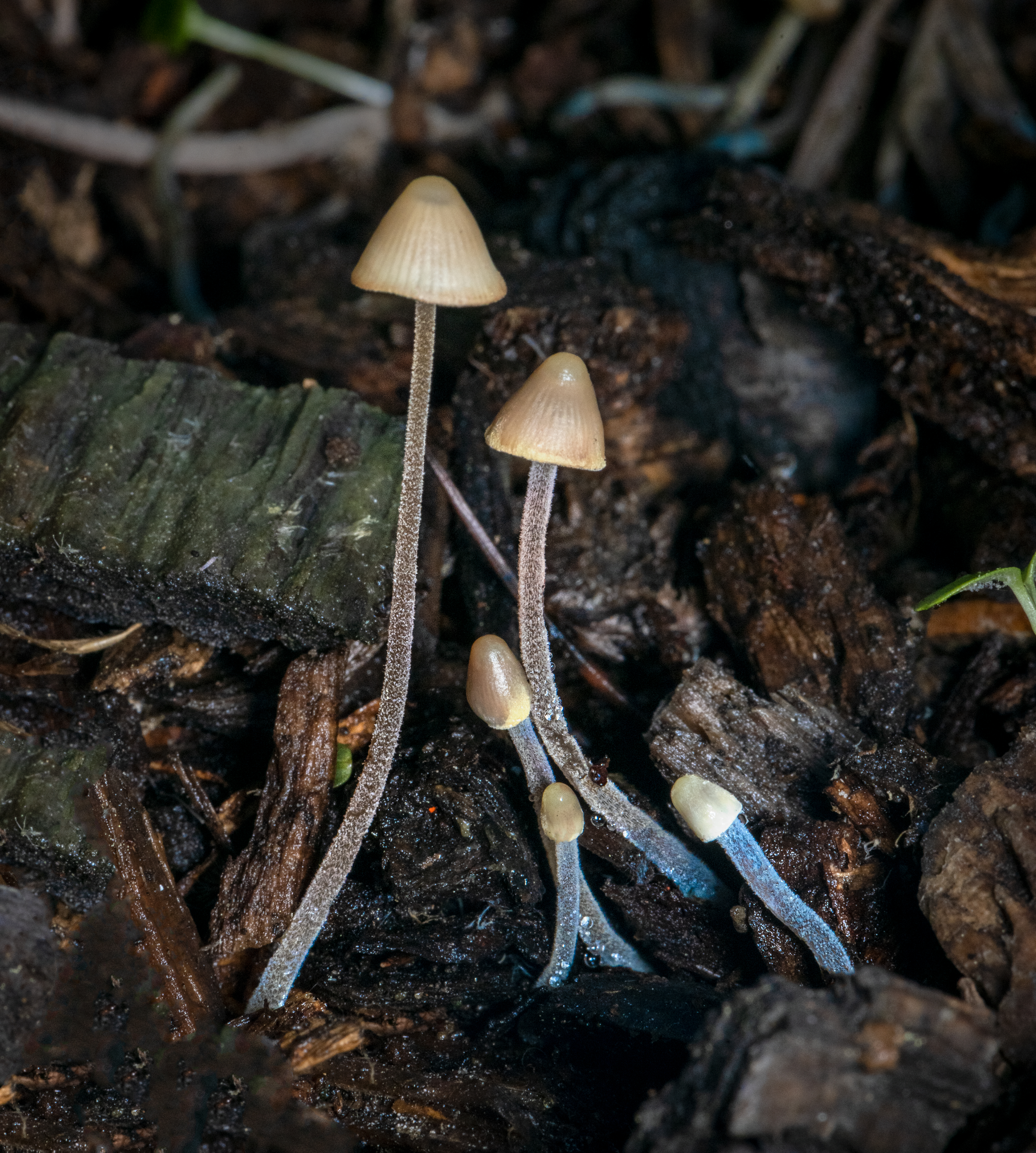

Scientific classification
- Domain: Eukaryota
- Kingdom: Fungi
- Division: Basidiomycota
- Class: Agaricomycetes
- Order: Agaricales
- Family: Mycenaceae
- Genus: Mycena
- Species: M. amicta

Binomial name
- Mycena amicta (Fr.) Quél. (1872)

Synonyms
- Agaricus amictus Fr.

= Mycena amicta =

Species of fungus

Mycena amicta Mycological characteristics
- Gills on hymenium
- Cap is conical
- Hymenium is adnate
- Stipe is bare
- Spore print is white
- Ecology is saprotrophic
- Edibility is unknown

Mycena amicta, commonly known as the coldfoot bonnet, is a species of mushroom in the family Mycenaceae. It was first described in 1821 by mycologist Elias Magnus Fries.

== Description ==
Young specimens appear unmistakably blue; this fades to brownish hues in age. The cap, initially conical to convex in shape, flattens out with age and typically reaches diameters of up to 1.8 cm (3/4 in). The cap cuticle can be peeled. The gills are close and the stem is covered in powdery hairs.

=== Similar species ===
It can resemble M. subcaerulea and Psilocybe pelliculosa.

== Habitat and distribution ==
The mushrooms appear in small groups, on the trunks of broadleaved trees, and particularly in the Pacific Northwest, around rotted conifer wood. It appears from May to November on the West Coast, July–September further east.
