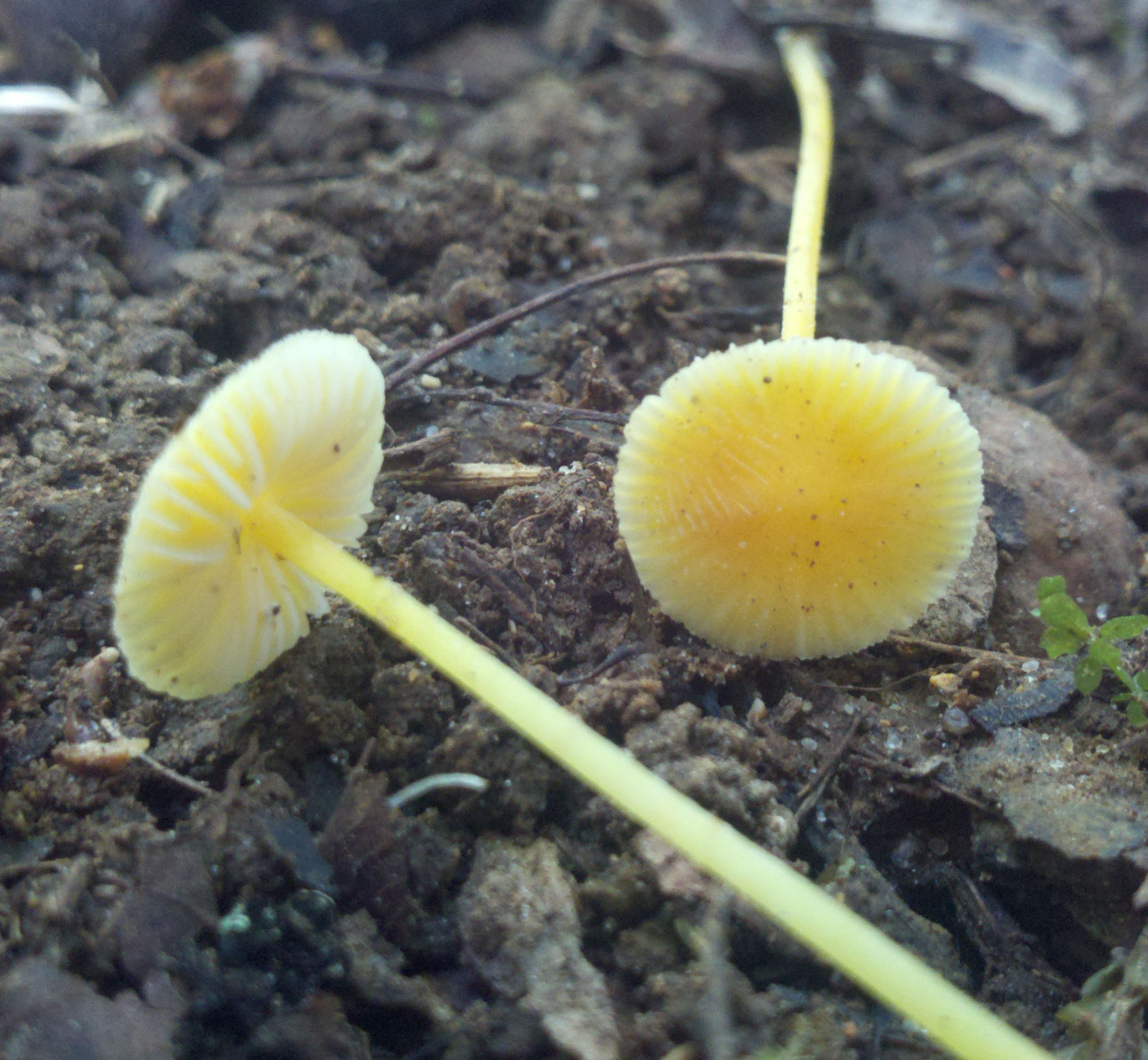

Scientific classification
- Kingdom: Fungi
- Division: Basidiomycota
- Class: Agaricomycetes
- Order: Agaricales
- Family: Mycenaceae
- Genus: Mycena
- Species: M. crocea

Binomial name
- Mycena crocea Maas Geesteranus (1991)

Synonyms
- Marasmius nucicola McDougall (1925); Mycena luteopallens sensu A. H. Smith (1947) non type

= Mycena crocea =

Species of fungus

Mycena crocea
- Mycological characteristics
- Gills on hymenium
- Cap is conical or convex
- Hymenium is adnate
- Stipe is bare
- Spore print is white
- Ecology is saprotrophic
- Edibility is unknown

Mycena crocea, commonly known as the walnut mycena, is a species of mushroom in the family Mycenaceae.

The small mushroom has a bright yellow, conical to broadly convex cap up to 15 mm (0.6 in) in diameter. The stem is tough and thin, up to 20 mm (0.8 in) tall, bright yellow at the top becoming progressively orange towards the base. The gills are adnate, subdistant, and yellowish, becoming lighter in age; and the spore print is white.

The mushroom is saprobic and found exclusively on hickory nuts and walnuts in eastern North America.

== Taxonomy ==
It was first described as Marasmius nucicola in 1925 but that name could not be used in Mycena. The mushroom is commonly known as the "walnut mycena" and was previously and commonly misidentified as Mycena luteopallens.

The specific epithet crocea refers to the orange color.

== Description ==
The cap is vivid yellow, conical to broadly convex cap and up to 15 mm (0.6 in) in diameter. When young the cap tends to be conical or bell-shaped becoming plane or flat at maturity. The margin is striated. The surface is moist, glabrous, and somewhat hygrophanous. The flesh is thin, pallid, and yellowish. The odor and taste are not distinctive. The gills have an adnate attachment and are a pale yellowish color. They are subdistantly spaced. The sturdy stem is 10 to 20 mm (0.4 to 0.8 in) long by 1 to 1.5 mm (0.04 to 0.06 in) thick. The stipe is central, equal (i.e., roughly equal in thickness at the top and bottom), and dark orange to yellowish.

The species is regarded as nonpoisonous, but is not necessarily edible.

=== Microscopic characteristics ===
The spores are 7–9 x 4–5 μm, smooth, and elliptical, and weakly amyloid to inamyloid. Pleurocystidia and cheilocystidia are present. The spore print is white.

=== Similar species ===
Mycena strobilinoides is similar to M. crocea, but is found in needle beds under conifers. Atheniella adonis has a fragile stem and a more reddish-pink coloration. Atheniella aurantiidisca has a conical cap.

== Habitat and distribution ==
Mycena crocea are found on hickory nuts and walnuts in eastern North America.
