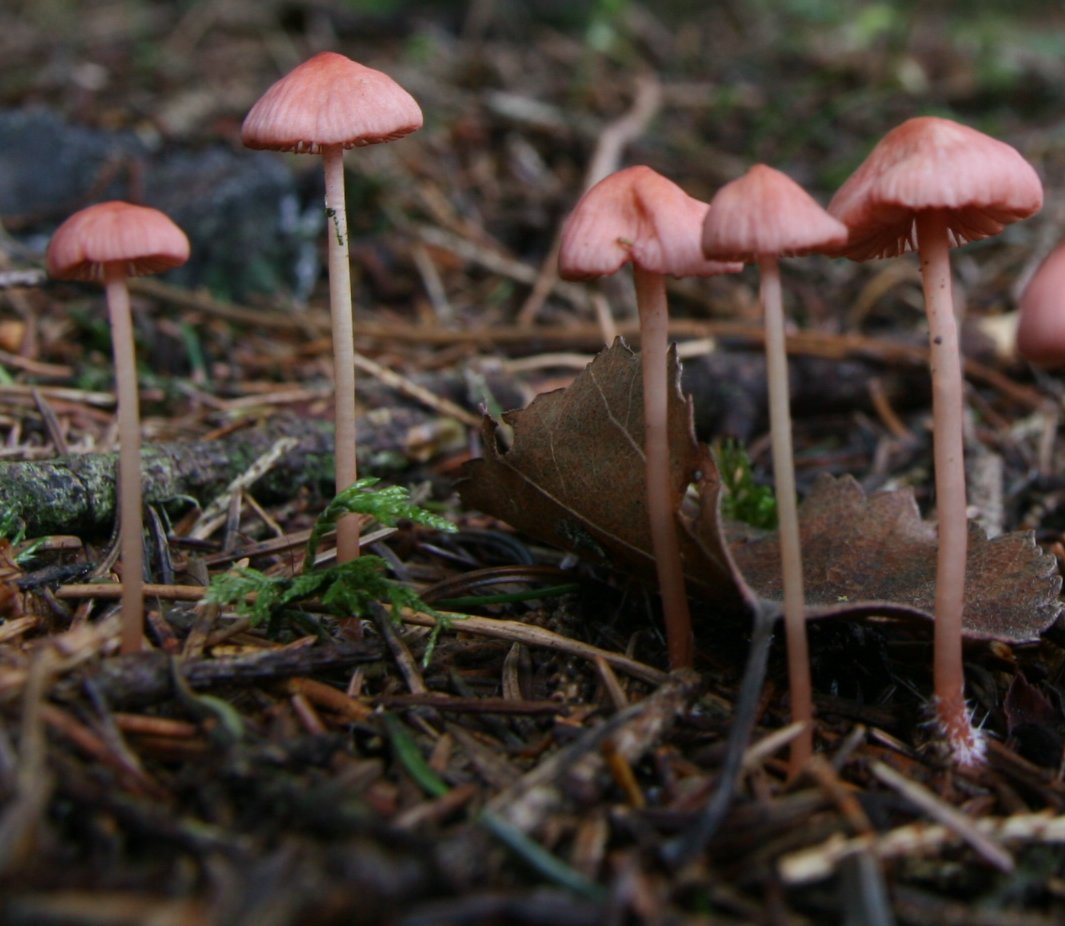

Scientific classification
- Domain: Eukaryota
- Kingdom: Fungi
- Division: Basidiomycota
- Class: Agaricomycetes
- Order: Agaricales
- Family: Mycenaceae
- Genus: Mycena
- Species: M. rosella

Binomial name
- Mycena rosella (Fr.) P. Kumm.

Synonyms
- Agaricus rhodellus Fr. Agaricus rosellus Fr. Agaricus roseus Pers. Mycena rosea (Pers.) Sacc.

= Mycena rosella =

Species of fungus

Mycena rosella Mycological characteristics
- Gills on hymenium
- Cap is conical
- Hymenium is adnate
- Stipe is bare
- Spore print is white
- Ecology is saprotrophic
- Edibility is unknown

Mycena rosella, commonly known as the pink bonnet, is a species of mushroom in the family Mycenaceae. First called Agaricus roseus by Swedish mycologist Elias Magnus Fries in 1794, it was assigned its current name in 1871 by German scientist Paul Kummer.

Microscopic characteristics

The spores are amyloid and have dimensions of 7–9 by 4–5 μm.
