= Mycena multiplicata =

Scientific classification
- Kingdom: Fungi
- Division: Basidiomycota
- Class: Agaricomycetes
- Order: Agaricales
- Family: Mycenaceae
- Genus: Mycena
- Species: M. multiplicata

Binomial name
- Mycena multiplicata Har.Takah. (2007)
- Known only from Kanagawa, Japan

Species of fungus

Mycena multiplicata Mycological characteristics
- Gills on hymenium
- Cap is conical
- Hymenium is adnate
- Stipe is bare
- Spore print is white
- Ecology is saprotrophic
- Edibility is unknown

Mycena multiplicata is a species of mushroom in the family Mycenaceae. First described as a new species in 2007, the mushroom is known only from the prefecture of Kanagawa, Japan, where it grows on dead fallen twigs in lowland forests dominated by oak. The mushroom has a whitish cap that reaches up to 13 mm (0.51 in) in diameter atop a slender stem 15 to 20 mm (0.59 to 0.79 in) long and 1 to 1.3 mm (0.039 to 0.051 in) thick. On the underside of the cap are whitish, distantly spaced gills that are narrowly attached to the stem. Microscopic characteristics of the mushroom include the amyloid spores (which turn bluish-black to black in the presence of Melzer's reagent), the pear-shaped to broadly club-shaped cheilocystidia (cystidia found on the gill edge) which are covered with a few to numerous, unevenly spaced, cylindrical protuberances, the lack of pleurocystidia (cystidia on the gill face), and the diverticulate hyphae in the outer layer of the cap and stem. The edibility of the mushroom is unknown.

== Taxonomy, naming, and classification ==
The mushroom was first collected by Japanese mycologist Haruki Takahashi in 1999, and reported as a new species in a 2007, along with seven other Japanese Mycenas. The specific epithet is derived from the Latin word multiplicata, meaning "multiplicative". Its Japanese name is Keashi-ochiedatake (ケアシオチエダタケ).

Takahashi suggests that the mushroom is best classified in the section Mycena of the genus Mycena, as defined by Dutch Mycena specialist Maas Geesteranus.

== Description ==
The cap of M. multiplicata is conical to convex to bell-shaped, reaching 7 to 13 mm (0.28 to 0.51 in) in diameter. It is often shallowly grooved toward the margin, dry, and somewhat hygrophanous (changing color when it loses or absorbs water). The cap surface is initially pruinose (appearing as if covered with a fine white powder), but soon becomes smooth. The cap color is whitish, sometimes pale brownish at the center. The white flesh is up to 0.3 mm thick, and does not have any distinctive taste or odor. The slender stem is 15 to 20 mm (0.59 to 0.79 in) long by 1 to 1.3 mm (0.039 to 0.051 in) thick, cylindrical, centrally attached to the cap, and hollow. Its surface is dry, pruinose near the top, and covered with fine, soft hairs toward the base. It is whitish to grayish-violet near the top, gradually becoming dark violet below. The stem base is covered with long, fairly coarse, whitish fibrils. The gills are narrowly attached to the stem, distantly spaced (between 13 and 16 gills reach the stem), up to 1.7 mm broad, thin, and whitish, with the gill edges the same color as the gill faces. The edibility of the mushroom has not been determined.

=== Microscopic characteristics ===
The spores are ellipsoid, thin-walled, smooth, colorless, amyloid, and measure 8–9.5 by 4 μm. The basidia (spore-bearing cells) are 24–31 by 6.5–7.5 μm, club-shaped, four-spored, and have clamps at the basal septa. The cheilocystidia (cystidia on the gill edge) are abundant, pear-shaped to broadly club-shaped, and measure 17–28 by 11–20 μm. They are covered with a few to numerous excrescences (outgrowths) that are 2–18 by 1–3 μm, colorless, and thin-walled. The excrescences are unevenly spaced, simple to somewhat branched, cylindrical, and straight or curved. There are no pleurocystidia (cystidia on the gill face) in this species. The hymenophoral (gill-producing) tissue is made of thin-walled hyphae that are 7–20 μm wide, cylindrical (but often inflated), smooth, hyaline (translucent), and dextrinoid (staining reddish to reddish-brown in Melzer's reagent). The cap cuticle is made of parallel, bent-over hyphae that are 3–5 μm wide, cylindrical, and covered with simple to highly branched colorless diverticulae that have thin walls. The layer of hyphae underneath the cap cuticle have a parallel arrangement, and are hyaline and dextrinoid, and made of short and inflated cells that are up to 52 μm wide. The stem cuticle is made of parallel, bent-over hyphae that are 2–10 μm wide, cylindrical, diverticulate, colorless or pale violet, dextrinoid, and thin-walled. The caulocystidia (cystidia on the stem) are 2–6 μm wide, and otherwise similar in appearance to the cheilocystidia. The stem tissue is made of longitudinally arranged, cylindrical hyphae measuring 5–13 μm wide that are smooth, hyaline, and dextrinoid. Clamp connections are present in the cap cuticle and flesh, and at the septa at the base of the basidia.

=== Similar species ===
Within the section Mycena, M. multiplicata is similar to the Malaysian species M. obcalyx in having a grayish-white cap, lobed cheilocystidia with finger-like outgrowths, and a lignicolous habitat. M. obcalyx may be distinguished by forming much smaller fruit bodies (with caps 2–4 mm wide) with subdecurrent gills, a pruinose (dusty-looking), hyaline (glassy) white stem, and broadly ellipsoid spores.

== Habitat and distribution ==
Mycena multiplicata is known only from Kanagawa, Japan. It is found growing solitary or scattered, on dead fallen twigs in lowland forests dominated by the oak species Quercus myrsinaefolia and Q. serrata.
