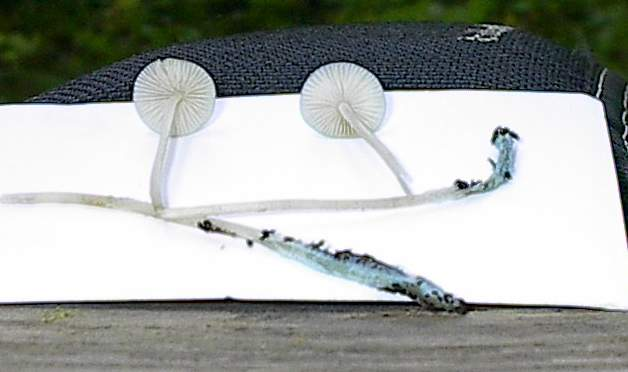

Scientific classification
- Kingdom: Fungi
- Division: Basidiomycota
- Class: Agaricomycetes
- Order: Agaricales
- Family: Mycenaceae
- Genus: Mycena
- Species: M. cyanorrhiza

Binomial name
- Mycena cyanorrhiza Quel.

= Mycena cyanorrhiza =

Species of fungus

Mycena cyanorrhiza
- Mycological characteristics
- Gills on hymenium
- Cap is conical
- Hymenium is adnate
- Stipe is bare
- Spore print is white
- Ecology is saprotrophic
- Edibility is unknown

Mycena cyanorrhiza is a small white mushroom which has blue colors. Unlike hallucinogenic mushrooms, the blue color is not related to psilocin polymerization. It grows in forests on wood and has a white spore print.

== Taxonomic revisions ==
According to the taxonomic revisions presented in the 2025 Journal of Fungi article, the species formerly known as Mycena cyanorhiza has been formally recombined as Basidopus cyanorhizus (Quél.) Kun L. Yang, Jia Y. Lin & Zhu L. Yang. The correct spelling of the species epithet is cyanorhiza (with a single 'r'), and the nomenclatural novelty is registered under the identifier FN572605.

== Gallery ==
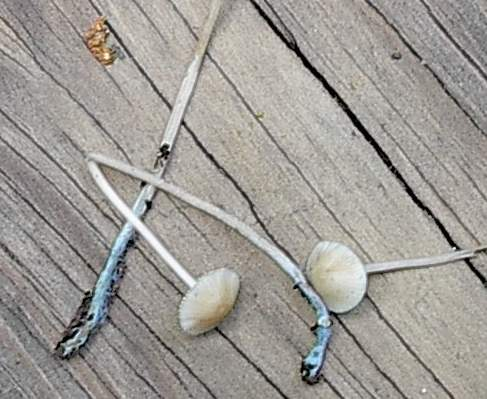
Mycena cyanorrhiza

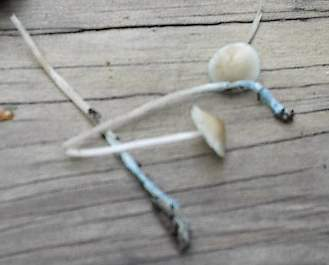
Mycena cyanorrhiza

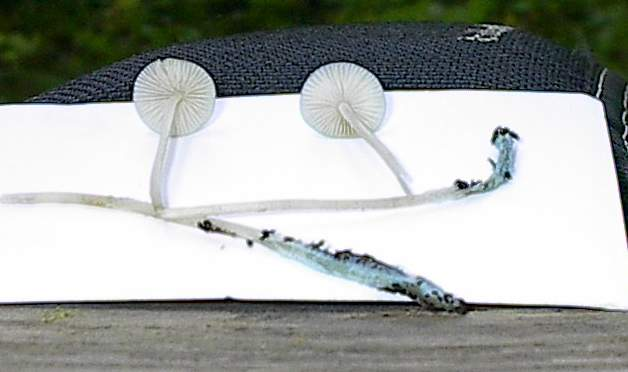
Mycena cyanorrhiza

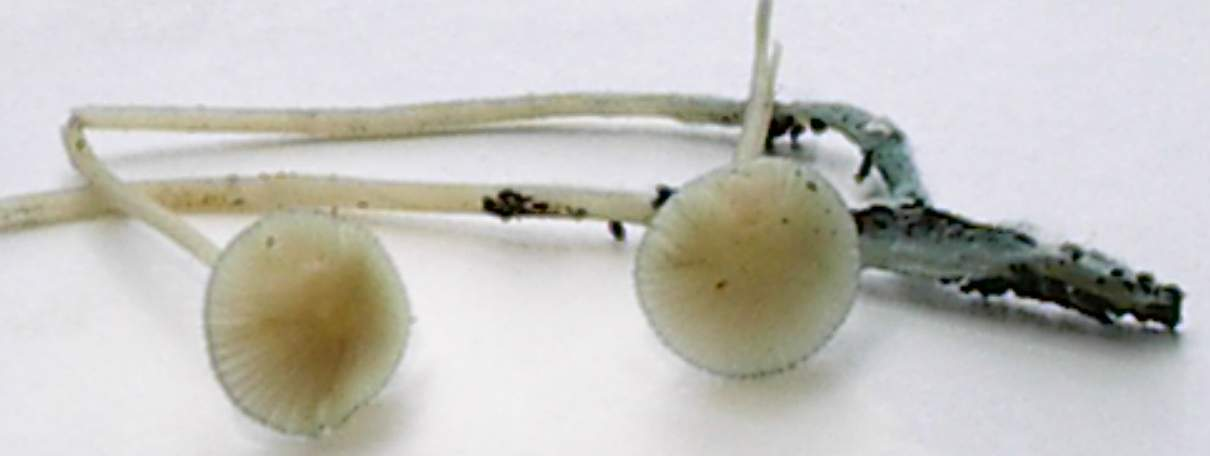
Mycena cyanorrhiza

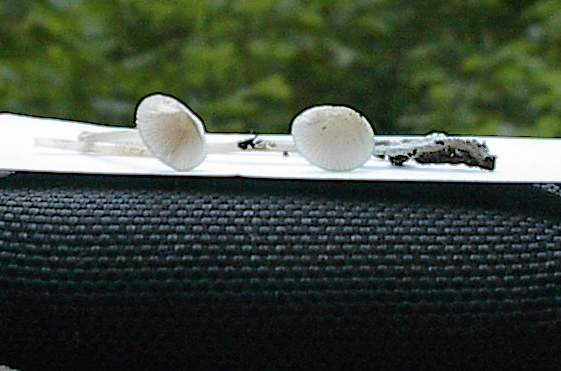
Mycena cyanorrhiza

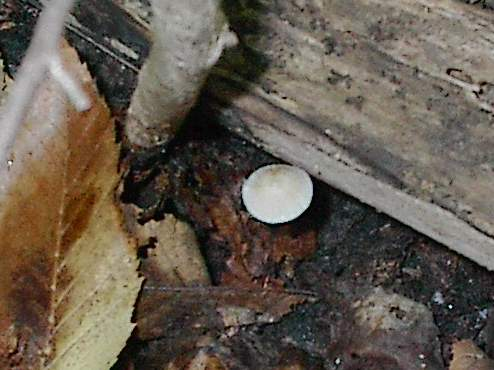
Mycena cyanorrhiza

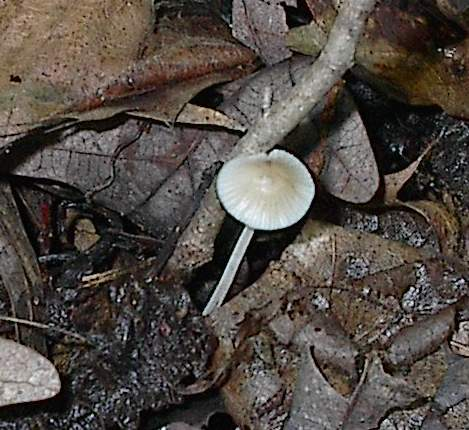
Mycena cyanorrhiza
