= Mycena fuscoaurantiaca =

Scientific classification
- Domain: Eukaryota
- Kingdom: Fungi
- Division: Basidiomycota
- Class: Agaricomycetes
- Order: Agaricales
- Family: Mycenaceae
- Genus: Mycena
- Species: M. fuscoaurantiaca

Binomial name
- Mycena fuscoaurantiaca Har.Takah. (2007)
- Known only from Kanagawa, Japan

Species of fungus

Mycena fuscoaurantiaca Mycological characteristics
- Gills on hymenium
- Cap is conical
- Hymenium is adnexed
- Stipe is bare
- Spore print is white
- Ecology is saprotrophic
- Edibility is unknown

Mycena fuscoaurantiaca is a species of mushroom in the family Mycenaceae. First reported as a new species in 2007, the diminutive mushroom is only found in Kanagawa, Japan, where it grows on dead fallen twigs in lowland forests dominated by hornbeam (Carpinus) and Chinese evergreen oak trees. The mushroom has a brownish-orange conical cap that has grooves extending to the center, and reaches up to 11 mm (0.43 in) in diameter. Its slender stem is colored similarly to the cap, and long—up to 60 mm (2.4 in) tall. Microscopic characteristics include the weakly amyloid spores (turning blue to black when stained with Melzer's reagent), the smooth, swollen cheilocystidia and pleurocystidia (cystidia on the gill edges and faces, respectively) with long rounded tips, the diverticulate hyphae of the cap cuticle, and the absence of clamp connections.

== Taxonomy, naming, and classification ==
The mushroom was first collected by Japanese mycologist Haruki Takahashi in 1999 and, along with seven other Mycena species, identified as a new species in a 2007 publication. The specific epithet is derived from the Latin words fusco- (meaning "dark") and aurantiaca ("orange-yellow"), and refers to the color of the fruit bodies. Its Japanese name is Taisha-ashinagatake タイシャアシナガタケ(代赭足長茸).

Takahashi suggests that the species is best classified in the section Fragilipedes, as defined by Dutch Mycena specialist Rudolph Arnold Maas Geesteranus. Within the section, the North American species M. subfusca appears to be closely related to M. fuscoaurantiaca. M. subfusca may be distinguished by its spindle- to broadly club-shaped cheilocystidia without a narrow neck, club-shaped to irregularly shaped caulocystidia, and lack of pleurocystidia.

== Description ==
The cap, which reaches 8 to 11 mm (0.31 to 0.43 in) in diameter, is initially conical to convex to bell-shaped, but becomes flattened in age. It is radially grooved almost to the center, and somewhat hygrophanous (changing color as it loses or absorbs moisture). The cap surface is dry, minutely pruinose initially (that is, appearing as if covered with a fine white powder), but soon becomes smooth. The cap is brown to brownish-orange when young, with a somewhat darker center, and fades to paler toward the margin with age. The flesh is white, and up to 0.5 mm thick. It does not have any distinctive taste or odor. The stem is 30 to 60 mm (1.2 to 2.4 in) long by 0.5 to 0.8 mm (0.020 to 0.031 in) thick, cylindrical, centrally attached to the cap, slender, hollow, and dry. Its color is orange to brownish-orange, and it is initially pruinose, but later becomes smooth. The base of the stem is covered with coarse, stiff white hairs. The gills are adnexed (narrowly attached to the stem), and distantly spaced, with between 16 and 18 gills reaching the stem. The gills are up to 1.8 mm broad, thin, and pale brownish. The gill edges are pruinose, and the same color as the gill face.

=== Microscopic characteristics ===
The basidiospores are ellipsoid and measure 9–10.5 by 6–7 μm. They are smooth, thin-walled, colorless, and weakly amyloid. The basidia (spore-bearing cells) are 19–30 by 7–9 μm, club-shaped, and two-spored. The cheilocystidia (cystidia on the gill edge) are thin-walled, smooth, 25–47 by 3–20 μm, abundant, spindle-shaped with a prolonged thickened tip, smooth, and colorless or pale vinaceous. The pleurocystidia (cystidia on the gill face) are 27–75 by 5–20 μm, scattered, and similar in shape and color to the cheilocystidia. The hymenophoral tissue (tissue of the hymenium-bearing structure) is made of thin-walled hyphae that are 10–22 μm wide, cylindrical, often somewhat inflated, smooth, colorless, and dextrinoid (turning reddish to reddish-brown when stained with Melzer's reagent). The cap cuticle is made of parallel, bent-over hyphae that are 2–7 μm wide, and cylindrical. These hyphae are smooth or covered with scattered, warty or finger-like thin-walled brownish diverticulae. The layer of hyphae beneath the cap cuticle is arranged in a parallel manner, hyaline (translucent), and dextrinoid, containing short and inflated cells that measure up to 34 μm wide. The cuticle of the stem is made of parallel, bent-over hyphae that are 2–4 μm wide, cylindrical, smooth, brownish, and thin-walled. The flesh of the stem is composed of longitudinally running, cylindrical hyphae that are 8–20 μm wide, smooth, colorless, and dextrinoid. The strigose (stiff or bristly) hairs at the base of the stem are 2–6 μm wide, and arise directly from the stem cuticle. They are bent-over or erect, cylindrical, with rounded tips, sometimes flexuous (winding from side to side), smooth, colorless, and thin-walled. Clamp connections are absent in all tissues of this species.

== Habitat and distribution ==
Mycena fuscoaurantiaca is known only from Kanagawa, Japan. It is found growing solitary to scattered on dead fallen twigs in lowland forests dominated by hornbeam carpinus (Carpinus tschonoskii) and Chinese evergreen oak (Quercus myrsinifolia). Fruit bodies appear in November.
