= Mycena metata =

- In Bruderwald Forest, Bamberg, Germany.

Scientific classification
- Kingdom: Fungi
- Division: Basidiomycota
- Class: Agaricomycetes
- Order: Agaricales
- Family: Mycenaceae
- Genus: Mycena
- Species: M. metata

Binomial name
- Mycena metata (Fr.) P.Kumm. (1871)

Synonyms
- Agaricus laevigatus Pers. (1801); Agaricus metatus Fr. (1821); Agaricus metatus var. laevigatus (Pers.) Fr. (1821); Mycena filopes var. metata (Fr.) Arnolds (1982)

Species of fungus

Mycena metata
- Mycological characteristics
- Gills on hymenium
- Cap is conical or campanulate
- Hymenium is adnexed
- Stipe is bare
- Spore print is white
- Ecology is saprotrophic
- Edibility is inedible

Mycena metata is a species of fungus in the family Mycenaceae found in Europe. It is inedible.
