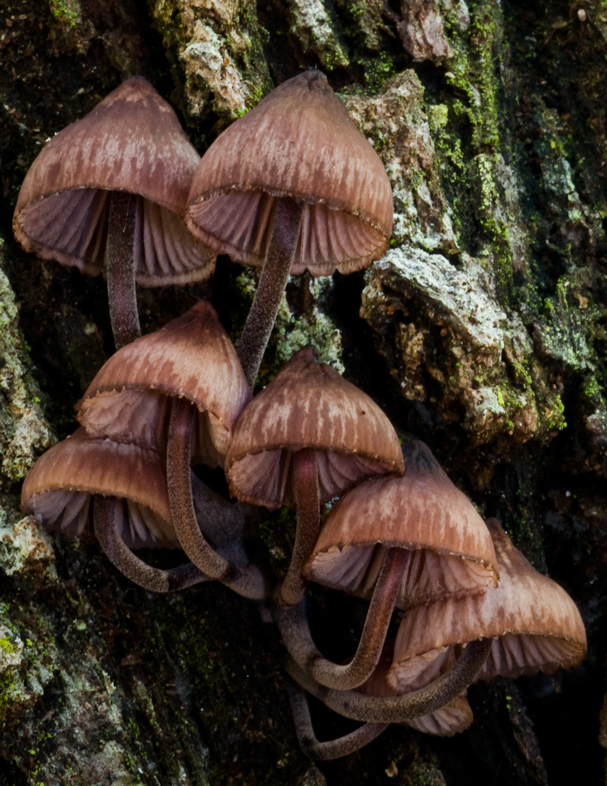

Scientific classification
- Domain: Eukaryota
- Kingdom: Fungi
- Division: Basidiomycota
- Class: Agaricomycetes
- Order: Agaricales
- Family: Mycenaceae
- Genus: Mycena
- Species: M. kuurkacea

Binomial name
- Mycena kuurkacea Grgur. (2003)

= Mycena kuurkacea =

Species of fungus

Mycena kuurkacea is a species of mushroom in the family Mycenaceae. It was first described in 2003 by Australian mycologist Cheryl A. Grgurinovic based on specimens found in New South Wales, Australia. Fruit bodies were found growing on leaf litter under Eucalyptus or on logs of Eucalyptus or Bedfordia salicina.
