= Mycena tenuispinosa =

Scientific classification
- Domain: Eukaryota
- Kingdom: Fungi
- Division: Basidiomycota
- Class: Agaricomycetes
- Order: Agaricales
- Family: Mycenaceae
- Genus: Mycena
- Species: M. tenuispinosa

Binomial name
- Mycena tenuispinosa J.Favre (1957)

Species of fungus

Mycena tenuispinosa is a species of agaric fungus in the family Mycenaceae. It was described as new to science by Swiss naturalist Jules Favre in 1957. Classified in the section Basipedes of the genus Mycena, it is characterized by the presence of sharp spinules of the surface of its cap. It has been reported from several western European countries, including Switzerland, Germany, Italy, Slovakia, and the Netherlands, and in 2006, it was recorded from Poland.
