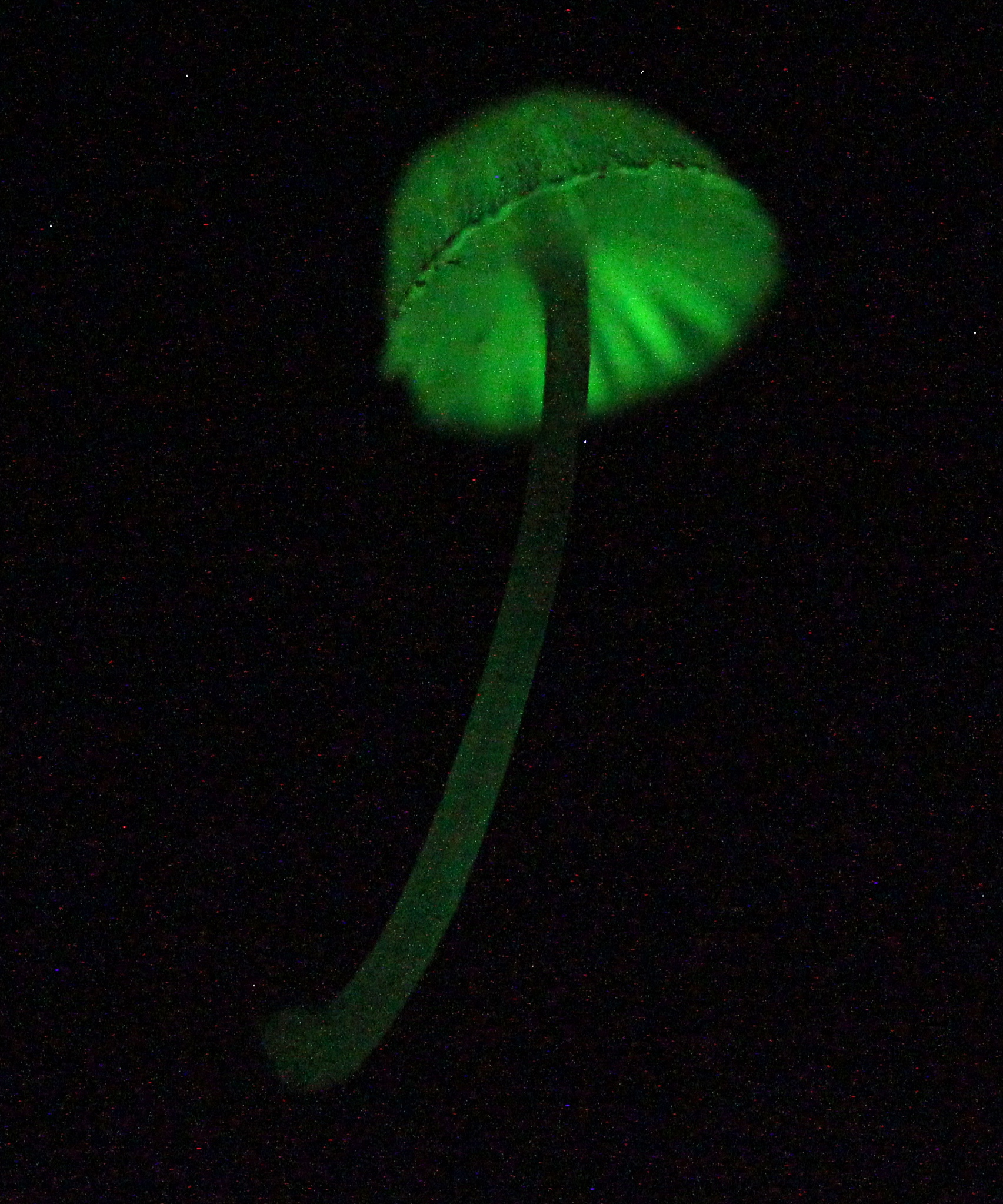

Scientific classification
- Kingdom: Fungi
- Division: Basidiomycota
- Class: Agaricomycetes
- Order: Agaricales
- Family: Mycenaceae
- Genus: Mycena
- Species: M. nebula

Binomial name
- Mycena nebula Cortés-Pérez, Desjardin & Rockefeller (2019)

= Mycena nebula =

Species of fungus

Mycena nebula is a species of fungus belonging to the Mycena genus. It was discovered in Veracruz in Mexico growing on moss-covered bark on living trees. It was documented in 2019 by A. Cortés-Pérez, Desjardin, and A. Rockefeller.

Mycena nebula
- Mycological characteristics
- Gills on hymenium
- Cap is conical or umbonate
- Hymenium is adnate
- Stipe is bare
- Edibility is unknown

== Description ==
The cap is 3–9 mm (0.1-0.35 in) in diameter and initially a broad conical shape, expanding to become convex or umbonate. The cap is moist and smooth, and the color ranges from pale pink to a dark red or purple hue. When cut or bruised, a dark red latex is released. The gills are adnate to adnate with a decurrent tooth, distant, and white to pale pink. The stipe is central, cylindrical, hollow, and has a slightly swollen base. The stipe color ranges from red to translucent pink and releases a dark red latex when cut. The basidiome is bioluminescent and gives off a green light. The odor and edibility is unknown.
