= Mycena clariviolacea =

Scientific classification
- Kingdom: Fungi
- Division: Basidiomycota
- Class: Agaricomycetes
- Order: Agaricales
- Family: Mycenaceae
- Genus: Mycena
- Species: M. clariviolacea

Binomial name
- Mycena clariviolacea Har.Takah. (2007)
- Known only from Kanagawa, Japan

Species of fungus

Mycena clariviolacea Mycological characteristics
- Gills on hymenium
- Cap is conical
- Hymenium is adnate
- Stipe is bare
- Spore print is white
- Ecology is saprotrophic
- Edibility is unknown

Mycena clariviolacea is a mushroom in the family Mycenaceae. First reported as a new species in 2007, it is known only from Kanagawa, Japan, where it fruits on dead fallen twigs in forests dominated by oak and chinquapin trees. Distinctive features of this species are found in its medium-sized, dark violet fruit bodies, with caps up to 25 mm (0.98 in) in diameter and slender stems that are about 30 to 40 mm (1.2 to 1.6 in) long. Microscopic characteristics include the amyloid spores (staining when treated with Melzer's reagent), the club-shaped cheilocystidia (cystidia on the gill edge) that are covered with one or more, knob-like, apical protuberances, the absence of pleurocystidia (cystidia on the gill face), and the cylindrical, diverticulate caulocystidia (cystidia on the stem).

== Taxonomy, naming, and classification ==
The mushroom was first collected by Japanese mycologist Haruki Takahashi in 2000, and, along with seven other Mycena species, was reported as a new species in a 2007 publication. The specific epithet is derived from the Latin words clari- (meaning "clear") and violacea ("violaceous"). The Japanese name is Shikon-sakuratake (シコンサクラタケ).

According to Takahashi, the amyloid spores, the cheilocystidia covered with one or more, knob-like, apical excrescences, the diverticulate elements in the cortical layer of cap and stem, and the diverticulate caulocystidia suggest that the species is best classified in the section Fragilipedes, as defined by the Dutch Mycena specialist Maas Geesteranus.

== Description ==
Depending on the age of the mushroom, the cap can range in shape from conic to convex to bell-shaped to somewhat flattened in age; it reaches 10 to 25 mm (0.4 to 1.0 in) in diameter. It is sometimes shallowly umbilicate (with a small depression like a navel), radially grooved almost to the center, and somewhat hygrophanous (changing color as it loses or absorbs water). The cap surface is dry, and pruinose (covered with what appears to be a fine white powder), but this soon sloughs off, leaving the surface smooth. Initially, the cap color is dark violet, but it later fades to grayish-violet around the edges. The whitish flesh is up to 0.5 mm thick, and lacks any distinctive taste or odor. The slender stem is 30 to 40 mm (1.2 to 1.6 in) long by 1 to 3 mm (0.04 to 0.12 in) thick, cylindrical, centrally attached to the stem, and hollow. Its surface is dry, pruinose over the entire length, and grayish-violet to dark violet in color. The base is covered with a white mycelial tomentum (a hairy covering of short, closely matted hairs). The gills are adnate (fused to the stem), and distantly spaced, with about 15–19 gills reaching the stem. The gills are up to 2.5 mm (0.1 in) broad, thin, and the same color as the cap or paler.

=== Microscopic characteristics ===
The spores are broadly ellipsoid, smooth, colorless, amyloid (staining bluish to blue-black when treated with Melzer's reagent), thin-walled, and measure 8–9 by 5–6 μm. The basidia are 40–60 by 10–12 μm, club-shaped, and four-spored. The cheilocystidia (cystidia on the gill edge) are abundant, club-shaped, and measure 30–45 by 10–17 μm. Their tips are covered with one or more, knob-like short excrescences that are colorless and thin-walled. Pleurocystidia (cystidia on the gill face) are absent. The hymenophoral tissue (tissue of the hymenium-bearing structure) is made of thin-walled hyphae that are 12–21 μm wide, cylindrical (but often somewhat inflated), smooth, and contain cytoplasmic brownish pigment. These hyphae are dextrinoid, meaning that they stain reddish to reddish-brown in Melzer's reagent. The cap cuticle is made of parallel, bent-over hyphae that are 2–7 μm wide, and cylindrical. These hyphae are smooth, or can be covered with scattered, warty or finger-like thin-walled diverticulae that are colorless or pale brownish, and dextrinoid. The layer of hyphae underlying the cap cuticle is parallel, cylindrical, hyaline or brownish, and dextrinoid; it has short and inflated cells that are up to 48 μm wide. The stem cuticle is made of parallel, bent-over hyphae that are 3–8 μm wide, and similar to the hyphae of the cap cuticle. The caulocystidia (cystidia on the stem) are 45–88 by 5–8 μm, cylindrical, diverticulate, colorless or brownish, and thin-walled. The flesh of the stem is composed of longitudinally running, cylindrical hyphae that are 8–25 μm wide, smooth, colorless, and dextrinoid. Clamp connections are present in the cap cuticle, the stem cuticle, the gill flesh, and at the basal septa of the basidia.

=== Similar species ===
Mycena clariviolacea is similar to the Brazilian species M. cerasina and the European M. diosma. Mycena cerasina, which belongs in the section Cerasinae of the genus Mycena, differs in having a grayish-purple cap and stem, and forming somewhat utriform (wineskin-shaped) to lageniform (flask-shaped), smooth cheilocystidia. Mycena diosma, classified in the section Calodontes, subsection Purae, may be distinguished microscopically from M. clariviolacea by its smooth, spindle-shaped cheilocystidia and pleurocystidia, and nondiverticulate hyphae in the cortical layer of cap and stem.

== Habitat and distribution ==
Mycena clariviolacea is known only from Kanagawa, Japan. Fruit bodies are found growing solitary or scattered, on dead fallen twigs in forests that are dominated by oak and chinquapin trees. The mushroom fruits from June to September.
