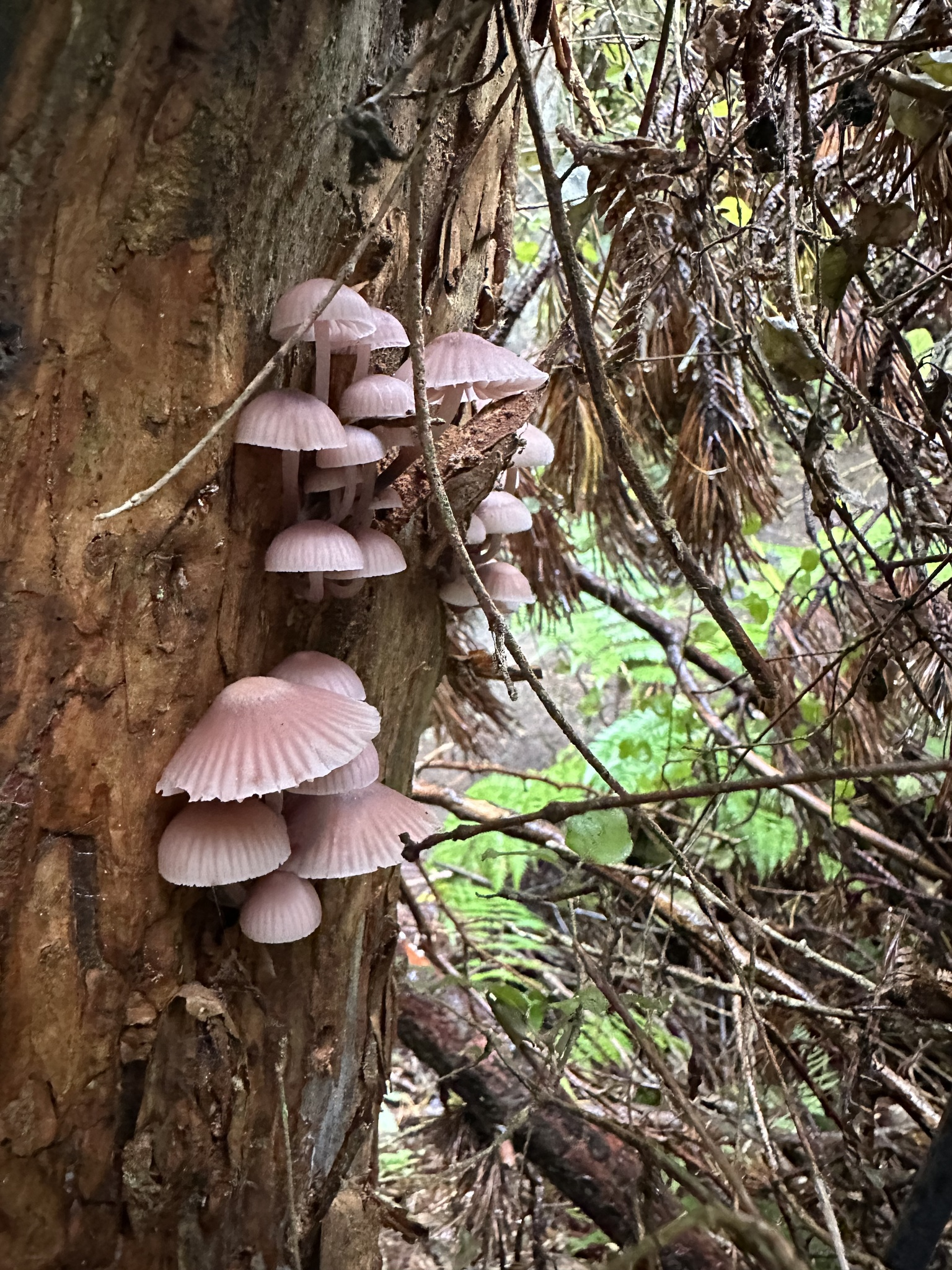
- Mycena clarkeana growing on tree fuchsia

Scientific classification
- Domain: Eukaryota
- Kingdom: Fungi
- Division: Basidiomycota
- Class: Agaricomycetes
- Order: Agaricales
- Family: Mycenaceae
- Genus: Mycena
- Species: M. clarkeana

Binomial name
- Mycena clarkeana C. A Grgurinovic (1997)

= Mycena clarkeana =

Species of fungi

Mycena clarkeana is a species of bonnet fungus in the genus Mycena. Originally endemic to Australia, it can now be found in New Zealand also.

== Taxonomy ==
The species was first described by C. A Grgurinovic in 1997 in a book titled The large fungi of Southern Australia.

== Description ==
Mycena clarkeana is a saprotrophic fungi and is most commonly found growing on dead logs. The pileus is ovate in shape and ranges from 5 millimeters to 3 centimeters in diameter depending on the maturity of the organism. The pileus is dark to light pink with purple hues and is hygrophanous. The stipe is long and thin and often translucent. It is typically 1-4 centimeters long and 2-5 millimeters in diameter and attaches to the pileus centrally. The gills found under the pileus are small, slimy and tightly packed together. Mycena clarkeana has a white spore print.

== Habitat ==
Mycena clarkeana occurs in the forests of Australia as well as the North and South Island of New Zealand. It is saprotrophic and therefore is most commonly found on dead organic matter such as dead trees.

== Etymology ==
Mycena has two derivations. The first is from Greek mythology and the Greek city of Mycenae. This name was chosen due to the mushrooms having delicate slender exteriors, much like the architecture of the ancient city. The second derivation is from the Greek word “Mykes” which means mushroom or fungus.
