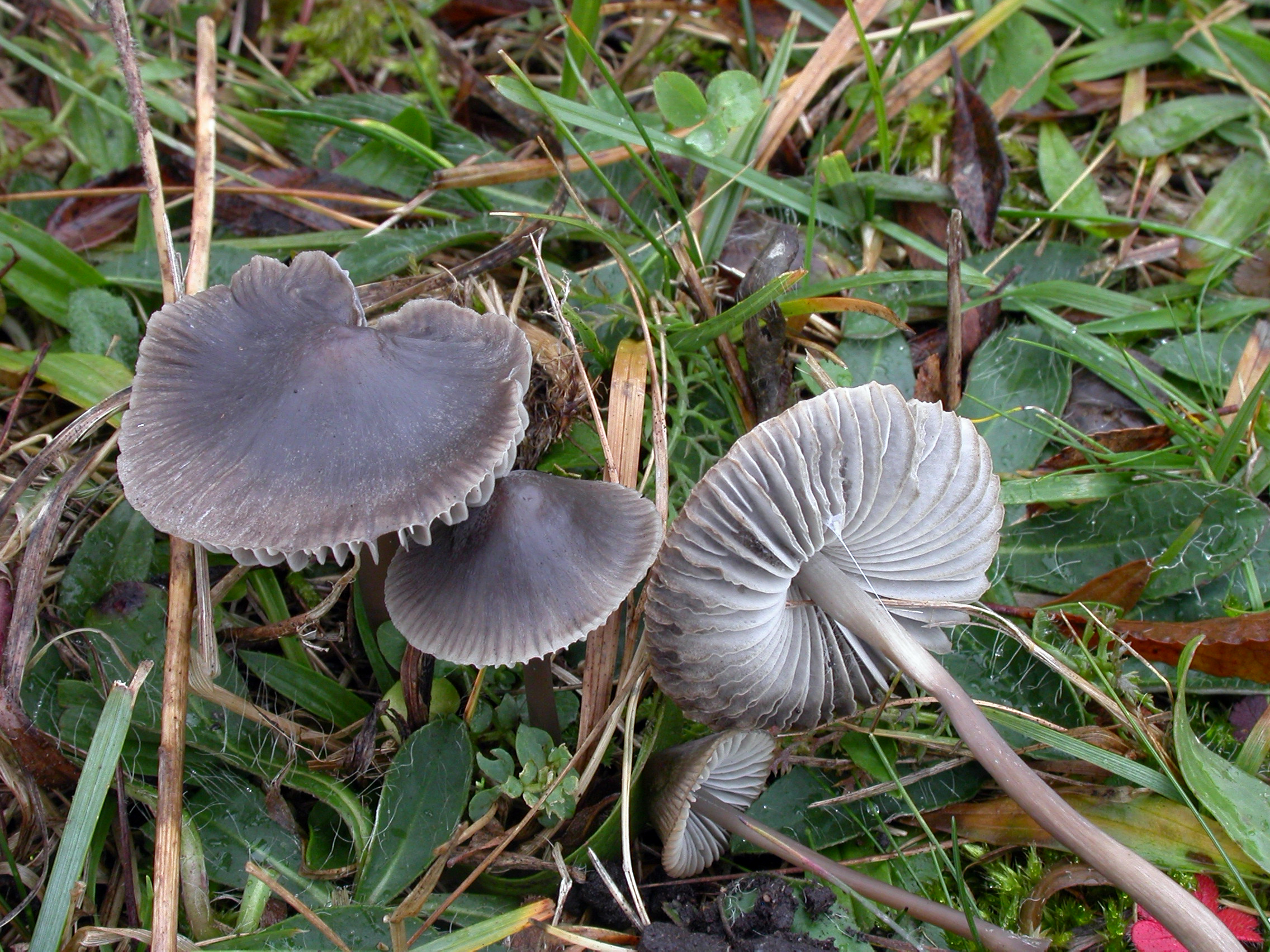

Scientific classification
- Domain: Eukaryota
- Kingdom: Fungi
- Division: Basidiomycota
- Class: Agaricomycetes
- Order: Agaricales
- Family: Mycenaceae
- Genus: Mycena
- Species: M. aetites

Binomial name
- Mycena aetites (Fr.) Quél. (1872)

Synonyms
- Agaricus aetites Fr. (1838); Agaricus consimilis Cooke; Agaricus umbelliferus Schaeff. Mycena cinerea Massee & Crossl. Mycena consimilis (Cooke) Sacc. Mycena umbellifera (Schaeff.) Quél.

= Mycena aetites =

Species of fungus

Mycena aetites Mycological characteristics
- Gills on hymenium
- Cap is conical
- Hymenium is adnate
- Stipe is bare
- Spore print is white
- Ecology is saprotrophic
- Edibility is inedible

Mycena aetites, commonly known as the drab bonnet, is a species of mushroom in the family Mycenaceae. First described as Agaricus aetites by Swedish mycologist Elias Magnus Fries in 1838, it was assigned its current name in 1872 by Lucien Quélet. This rare mushroom is found in Europe.

== Description ==
The cap is a grey-brown color that is somewhat darker in the center. Initially conical in shape, the cap flattens out in maturity to become bell-shaped; the cap can reach a diameter of up to 2 cm (0.8 in). The stipe of M. aetites has a pruinose apex and isglabrous below. The mushrooms has an raphanoid odour.

A similar species is Mycena abramsii. This species usually grows on woods and have cheilocystidia with a clear acute-neck.

=== Ecology ===
Mycena aetites grows on decayed wood and woody debris in temperate ecosystems.

=== Edibility ===
Mycena aetites is considered inedible. It has an indistinct taste, and a faint odor of radish.
