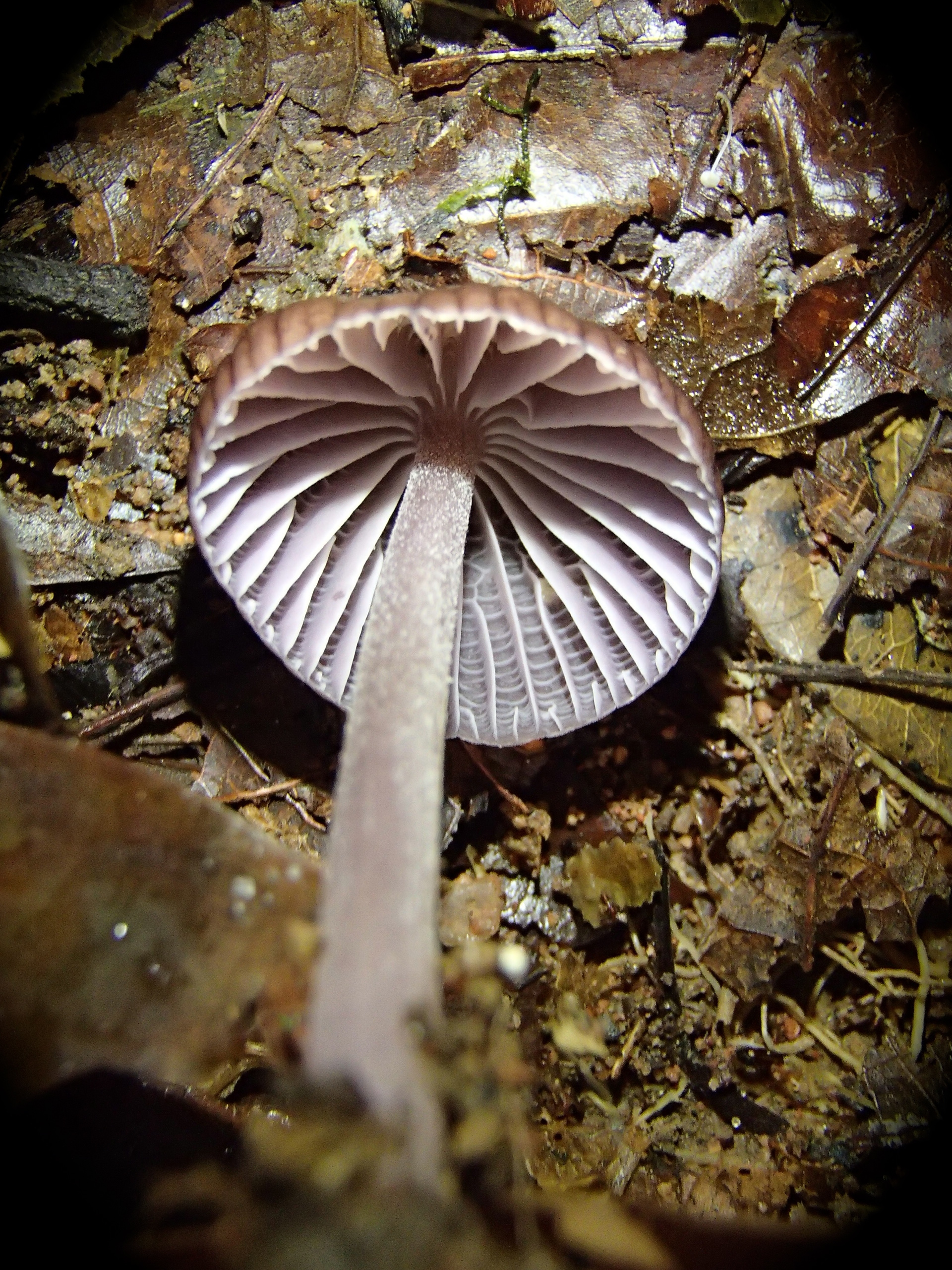

Scientific classification
- Domain: Eukaryota
- Kingdom: Fungi
- Division: Basidiomycota
- Class: Agaricomycetes
- Order: Agaricales
- Family: Mycenaceae
- Genus: Mycena
- Species: M. holoporphyra

Binomial name
- Mycena holoporphyra (Berk. & M.A.Curtis) Singer (1962)

Synonyms
- Agaricus holoporphyrus Berk. & M.A.Curtis (1868); Clitocybe holoporphyra (Berk. & M.A.Curtis) Sacc. (1887); Dictyoploca holoporphyra (Berk. & M.A.Curtis) Dennis (1951)

= Mycena holoporphyra =

Species of fungus

Mycena holoporphyra is a species of agaric fungus in the family Mycenaceae. It was first described by Miles Joseph Berkeley and Moses Ashley Curtis in 1868 as Agaricus holoporphyrus. Rolf Singer transferred it to the genus Mycena in 1962, where it is classified in the section Calodontes. First described from Cuba, it is also found in Trinidad, Africa, Mexico, and Central America and South America.Nicolas Niveirio, Orlando F. Popoff, and Edgardo O. Alberto, classify Mycena Holoporphyra for their distinguishable basiodiocarps that are violet or purple, having a radish like smell, fungal tissues, and a lack of pleurocystidia. In addition, Pegler, describes the species as having a pale cream spore print with spores of ellipse cylindrical to oblong cylindric, hyaline and deeply amyloid.
