= Mycena atkinsonii =

Scientific classification
- Domain: Eukaryota
- Kingdom: Fungi
- Division: Basidiomycota
- Class: Agaricomycetes
- Order: Agaricales
- Family: Mycenaceae
- Genus: Mycena
- Species: M. atkinsonii

Binomial name
- Mycena atkinsonii House (1920)

Species of fungus

Mycena atkinsonii is a species of agaric fungus in the family Mycenaceae. The species was first described scientifically by New York State botanist Homer Doliver House in 1920.
