= Mycena domingensis =

Scientific classification
- Domain: Eukaryota
- Kingdom: Fungi
- Division: Basidiomycota
- Class: Agaricomycetes
- Order: Agaricales
- Family: Mycenaceae
- Genus: Mycena
- Species: M. domingensis

Binomial name
- Mycena domingensis Dennis (1961)

Species of fungus

Mycena domingensis is a mushroom in the family Mycenaceae. Found in Venezuela, it was described in 1961 by English mycologist R.W.G. Dennis. The white fruit bodies have convex, smooth caps up to 7 mm (0.3 in) in diameter. The flesh is white. The gills are widely spaced, white, and decurrently attached to the stem. The spores are oblong, amyloid, and measure 4–6 by 2–2.5 μm.
