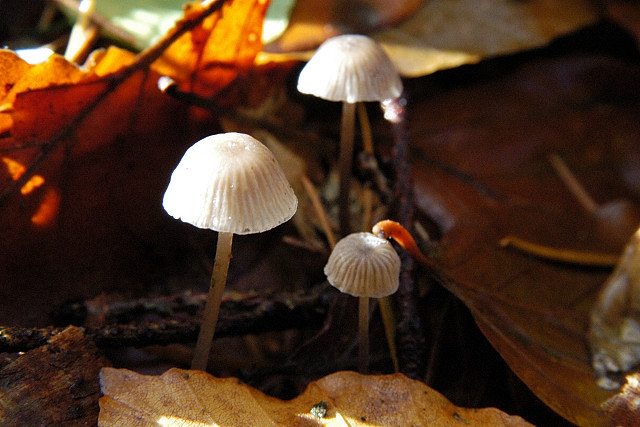

Scientific classification
- Domain: Eukaryota
- Kingdom: Fungi
- Division: Basidiomycota
- Class: Agaricomycetes
- Order: Agaricales
- Family: Mycenaceae
- Genus: Mycena
- Species: M. olida

Binomial name
- Mycena olida Bres. (1887)

Synonyms
- Hemimycena olida (Bres.) Singer; Marasmiellus olidus (Bres.) Singer (1951)

= Mycena olida =

Species of fungus

Mycena olida Mycological characteristics
- Gills on hymenium
- Cap is conical
- Hymenium is adnate
- Stipe is bare
- Spore print is white
- Ecology is saprotrophic
- Edibility is unknown

Mycena olida, commonly known as the rancid bonnet, is a species of mushroom in the family Mycenaceae. It was first described in 1887 by Italian mycologist Giacomo Bresadola.

== Description ==
The cap, initially conical to convex in shape, flattens out with age and typically reaches diameters of up to 1.5 cm (0.6 in).
