= Mycena intersecta =

Scientific classification
- Kingdom: Fungi
- Division: Basidiomycota
- Class: Agaricomycetes
- Order: Agaricales
- Family: Mycenaceae
- Genus: Mycena
- Species: M. intersecta

Binomial name
- Mycena intersecta Har.Takah. (2007)
- Known only from Kanagawa, Japan

Species of fungus

Mycena intersecta Mycological characteristics
- Gills on hymenium
- Cap is conical
- Hymenium is adnate
- Stipe is bare
- Spore print is white
- Ecology is saprotrophic
- Edibility is unknown

Mycena intersecta is a species of mushroom in the family Mycenaceae. First reported as a new species in 2007, it is known only from central Honshu, in Japan, where it is found growing solitarily or scattered, on dead leaves in lowland forests dominated by oak. The mushrooms have olive-brown caps up to 12 mm (0.47 in) in diameter atop slender stems that are 50 to 80 mm (2.0 to 3.1 in) long by 0.7 to 1.2 mm (0.03 to 0.05 in) thick. On the underside of the cap are the distantly spaced, whitish gills that have cross-veins running between them. Microscopic characteristics of the mushroom include the smooth, irregularly cylindrical cheilocystidia (cystidia on the gill edge), the absence of pleurocystidia (cystidia on the gill face), the diverticulate elements of the cap cuticle, the broadly club-shaped to irregularly shaped caulocystidia (cystidia on the stem), the weakly dextrinoid flesh (staining reddish to reddish-brown in Melzer's reagent), and the absence of clamp connections. The edibility of the mushroom is unknown.

== Taxonomy and naming ==
The mushroom was first collected by Japanese mycologist Haruki Takahashi in 1999, and published as a new species (along with seven other Japanese Mycenas) in a 2007 publication. The specific epithet is from the Latin word intersecta or "intersected", and refers to the intervenose gills. Its Japanese name is Oriibu-ashinagatake (オリーブアシナガタケ).

According to Takahashi, the fungus is best classified in the section Fragilipedes (Fr.) Quél., as defined by the Dutch Mycena specialist Maas Geesteranus.

== Description ==
The cap of M. intersecta is initially conical to convex to bell-shaped, eventually reaching 8 to 12 mm (0.31 to 0.47 in) in diameter. When it is moist, it is partly translucent, so that the outlines of the gills underneath the cap can be seen. The cap is somewhat hygrophanous, and dry. Its surface is initially minutely pruinose (as if covered with a fine white powder), but this effect soon sloughs off, leaving the surface smooth. The cap color is initially olive-brown to yellowish-brown, then somewhat paler from the margin. The white flesh is up to 0.7 mm thick, and lacks any distinctive taste and odor. The slender stem is 50 to 80 mm (2.0 to 3.1 in) long by 0.7 to 1.2 mm (0.03 to 0.05 in) thick, cylindrical, and hollow. Its surface is dry, and colored pale olive-brown near the top, becoming olive-brown downward. Like the cap, it is at first pruinose, but smooths out in age. The base of the stem is covered with coarse white hairs. The gills are adnate to subdecurrent (running slightly down the length of the stem), and distantly spaced, with 16–19 gills reaching the stem. The gills are up to 1.5 mm broad, thin, somewhat intervenose, and whitish, with edges that are the same color as the gill faces. Takahashi's description does not include any discussion of the mushroom's edibility.

=== Microscopic characteristics ===
The basidiospores are roughly ellipsoid and measure 7.5–8.5 by 5–6 μm. They are thin-walled, smooth, colorless, and inamyloid to weakly amyloid—indicating a weak ability to absorb the iodine in Melzer's reagent. The spore-bearing cells, the basidia are 22–31 by 5.5–7 μm, club-shaped, and mostly two-spored. The cheilocystidia (cystidia on the gill edge) are 27–40 by 3–6 μm, abundant, and form a sterile gill edge. They are irregularly cylindrical to constricted, smooth, colorless, and thin-walled. Pleurocystidia (cystidia on the gill face) are absent. The hymenophoral tissue is made of thin-walled hyphae that are 5–18 μm wide, cylindrical, smooth, colorless, and weakly dextrinoid. The cap cuticle is made of parallel, bent-over hyphae that are 2–6 μm wide, cylindrical, and densely covered with warty or finger-like thin-walled diverticulae that are colorless and inamyloid. The layer of hyphae underneath the cap cuticle are parallel, olive-brown, and weakly dextrinoid, with short and inflated cells up to 22 μm wide. The stem cuticle is made of parallel, bent-over hyphae that are 2–4 μm wide, cylindrical, smooth to sparsely diverticulate. These hyphae curve outward to form club-shaped or irregularly shaped caulocystidia (cystidia on the stem) that are olive-brown, inamyloid, and thin-walled. They measure 13–29 by 3–7 μm, and are broadly club-shaped to irregularly shaped, and often have one to three knob-like excrescences. The stem tissue is made of longitudinally running, cylindrical hyphae that are 5–12 μm wide, smooth, colorless, and have a weakly dextrinoid in Melzer's reagent. Clamp connections are absent in all tissues of M. intersecta.

=== Similar species ===
The European species Mycena viridimarginata is somewhat similar to M. intersecta in appearance, but may be distinguished by its greenish-edged gills, cheilocystidia with abruptly tapering points, and clamp connections.

== Habitat and distribution ==
Mycena intersecta is known only from Kanagawa, Japan. The fruit bodies are found solitary or scattered, on dead leaves in lowland forests dominated by the oak trees Quercus myrsinaefolia and Q. serrata.
