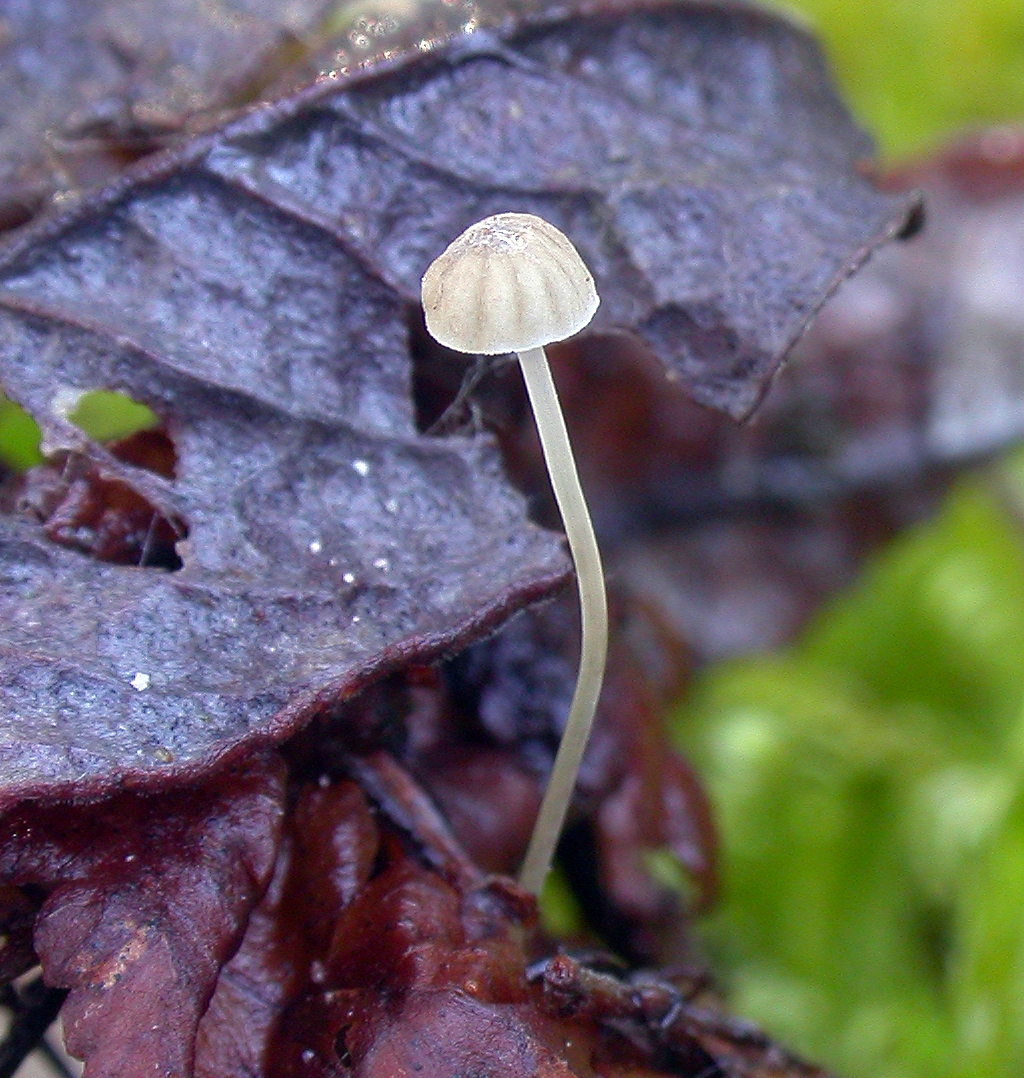

Scientific classification
- Domain: Eukaryota
- Kingdom: Fungi
- Division: Basidiomycota
- Class: Agaricomycetes
- Order: Agaricales
- Family: Mycenaceae
- Genus: Mycena
- Species: M. guldeniana

Binomial name
- Mycena guldeniana Aronsen & B.A.Perry (2011)

= Mycena guldeniana =

Species of fungus

Mycena guldeniana is a species of agaric fungus in the family Mycenaceae. Described as new to science in 2011, it occurs in Norway. The specific epithet guldeniana honors Norwegian mycologist Gro Gulden. The whitish caps of the fruit bodies are hemispherical before flattening out, and measure 1–2 mm in diameter. They appear solitarily or in small groups on the fallen leaves (occasionally on twigs) of Salix species. The spores are broadly ellipsoid to pip-shaped, smooth, amyloid, and measure 7.5–8.7–10 by 4.8–5.5–6.5 μm.
