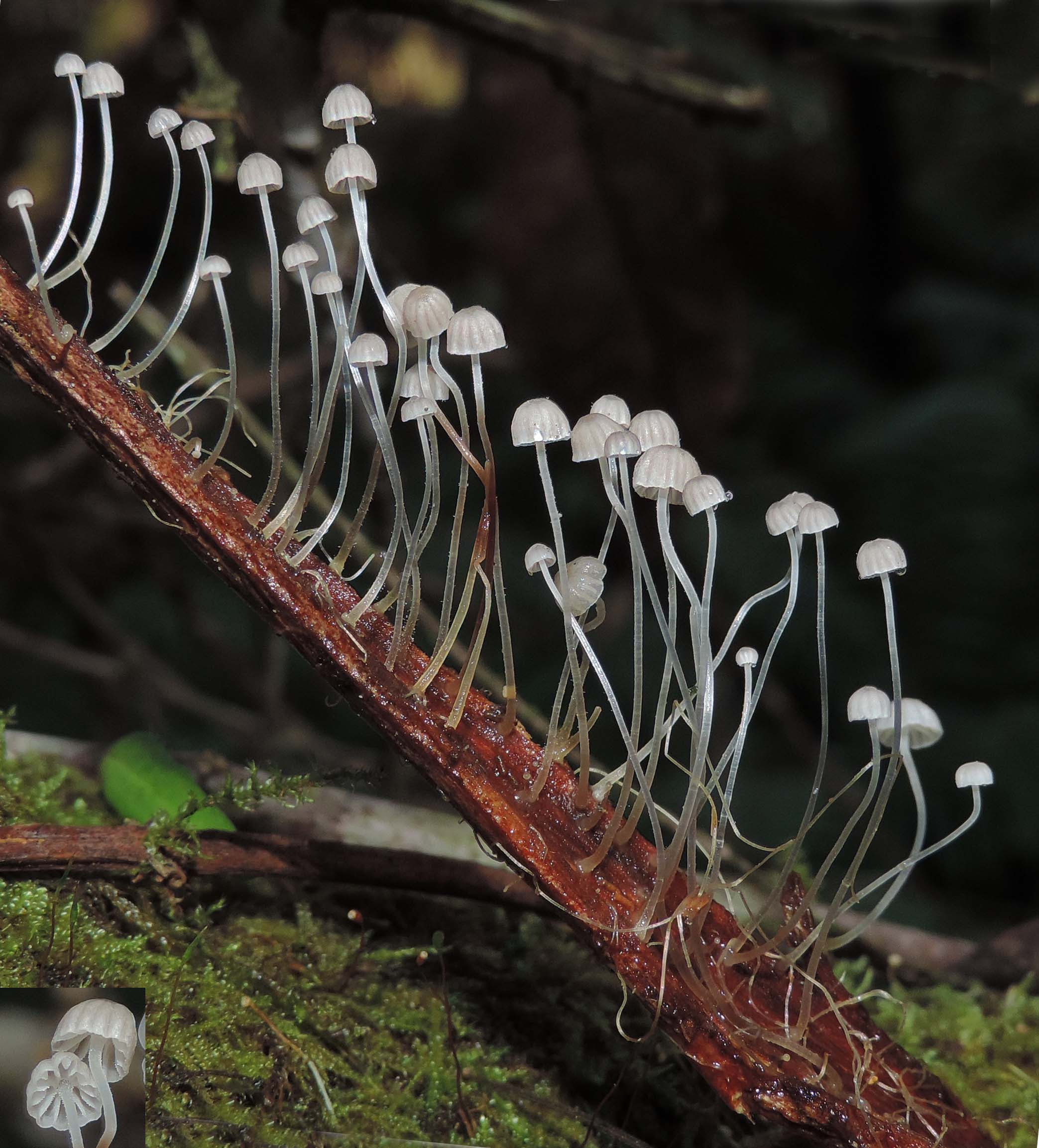

Scientific classification
- Domain: Eukaryota
- Kingdom: Fungi
- Division: Basidiomycota
- Class: Agaricomycetes
- Order: Agaricales
- Family: Mycenaceae
- Genus: Mycena
- Species: M. albidocapillaris

Binomial name
- Mycena albidocapillaris Grgur. & T.W.May (1997)

Synonyms
- Mycena subcapillaris Cleland (1933)

= Mycena albidocapillaris =

Species of fungus

Mycena albidocapillaris is a species of mushroom in the family Mycenaceae that is found in Australia. It was first described scientifically in 1933 by mycologist John Burton Cleland, who named it Mycena subcapillaris. The type collection was made in 1922 on Mount Lofty. It was later discovered that the name was invalid, as Paul Hennings use of that name in 1899 took precedence. Cheryl Grgurinovic and Tom May republished the species with the new replacement name Mycena albidocapillaris in 1997.

The small, delicate Fruit bodies of the fungus feature white to brownish caps measuring 3–5 mm (0.12–0.20 in) in diameter, held by a slender translucent to whitish stipe up to 30 mm (1.2 in) long. The gills on the cap underside are few and rather distantly spaced. The fungus fruits in groups on leaves, twigs and stigs, and decaying fern fronds.
