= Mycena noctilucens =

Scientific classification
- Kingdom: Fungi
- Division: Basidiomycota
- Class: Agaricomycetes
- Order: Agaricales
- Family: Mycenaceae
- Genus: Mycena
- Species: M. noctilucens

Binomial name
- Mycena noctilucens Corner (1954)

Species of fungus

Mycena noctilucens is a species of agaric fungus in the family Mycenaceae. The species was first described scientifically by E.J.H. Corner in 1954. Found in Malaysia and the Pacific islands, the mycelium of the fungus is bioluminescent.

== See also ==
- List of bioluminescent fungi
