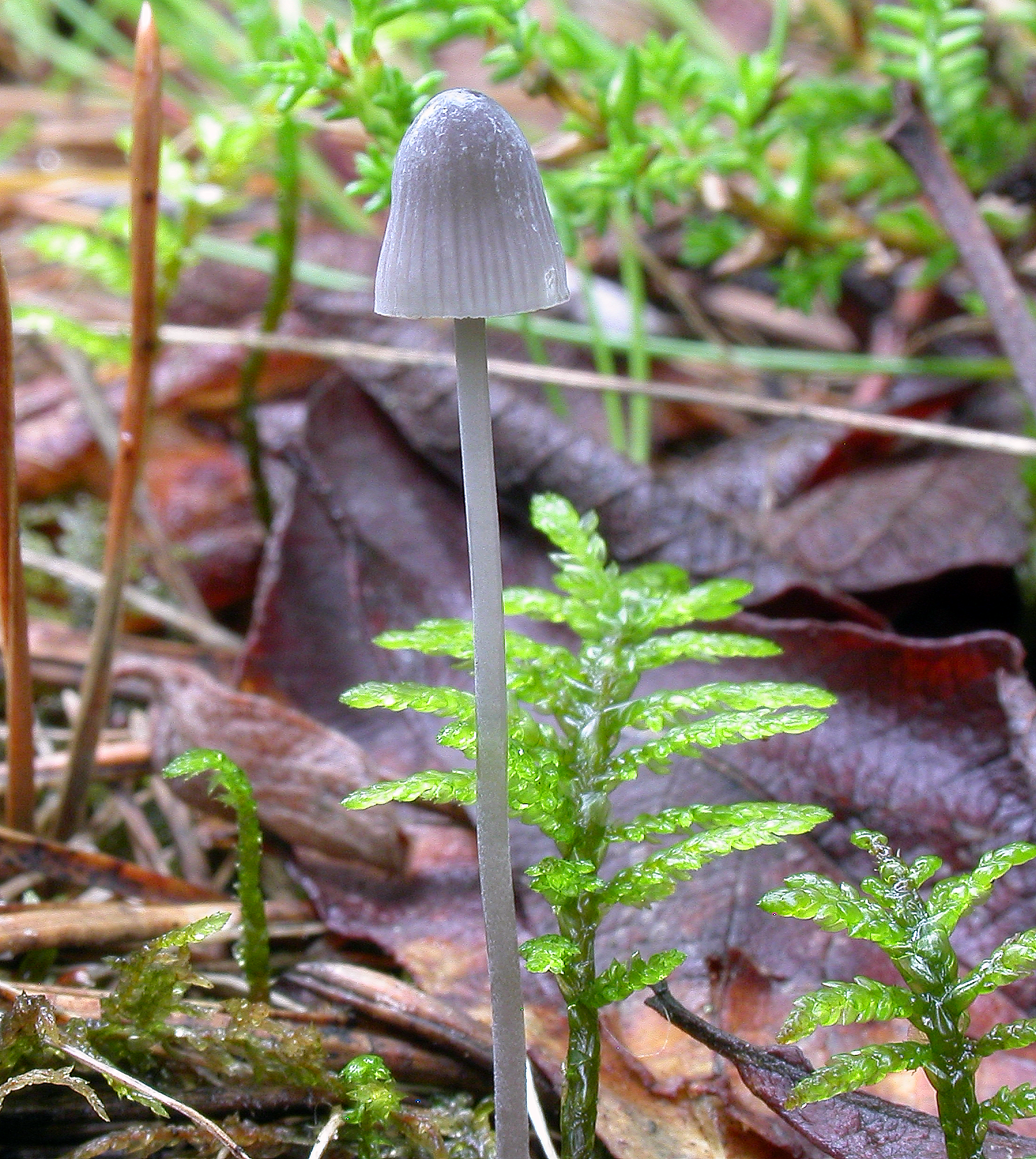

Scientific classification
- Domain: Eukaryota
- Kingdom: Fungi
- Division: Basidiomycota
- Class: Agaricomycetes
- Order: Agaricales
- Family: Mycenaceae
- Genus: Mycena
- Species: M. urania

Binomial name
- Mycena urania (Fr.) Quél.

Synonyms
- Agaricus uranius Fr.

= Mycena urania =

Species of fungus

Mycena urania Mycological characteristics
- Gills on hymenium
- Cap is conical
- Hymenium is adnate
- Stipe is bare
- Spore print is white
- Ecology is saprotrophic
- Edibility is unknown

Mycena urania, commonly known as the violet bonnet, is a species of mushroom in the family Mycenaceae. First named Agaricua uranius in 1818 by Swedish mycologist Elias Magnus Fries, it was assigned its current name in 1872 by the French naturalist Lucien Quélet.

== Description ==
The cap is initially conic in shape, and expands to hemispheric in maturity, typically reaching 0.4 to 1 cm (0.2 to 0.4 in) in diameter.

== Distribution ==
A rare species, the North American distribution of Mycena urania includes Michigan, North Carolina, and Tennessee. It has also been collected in the Scottish Cairngorms.
