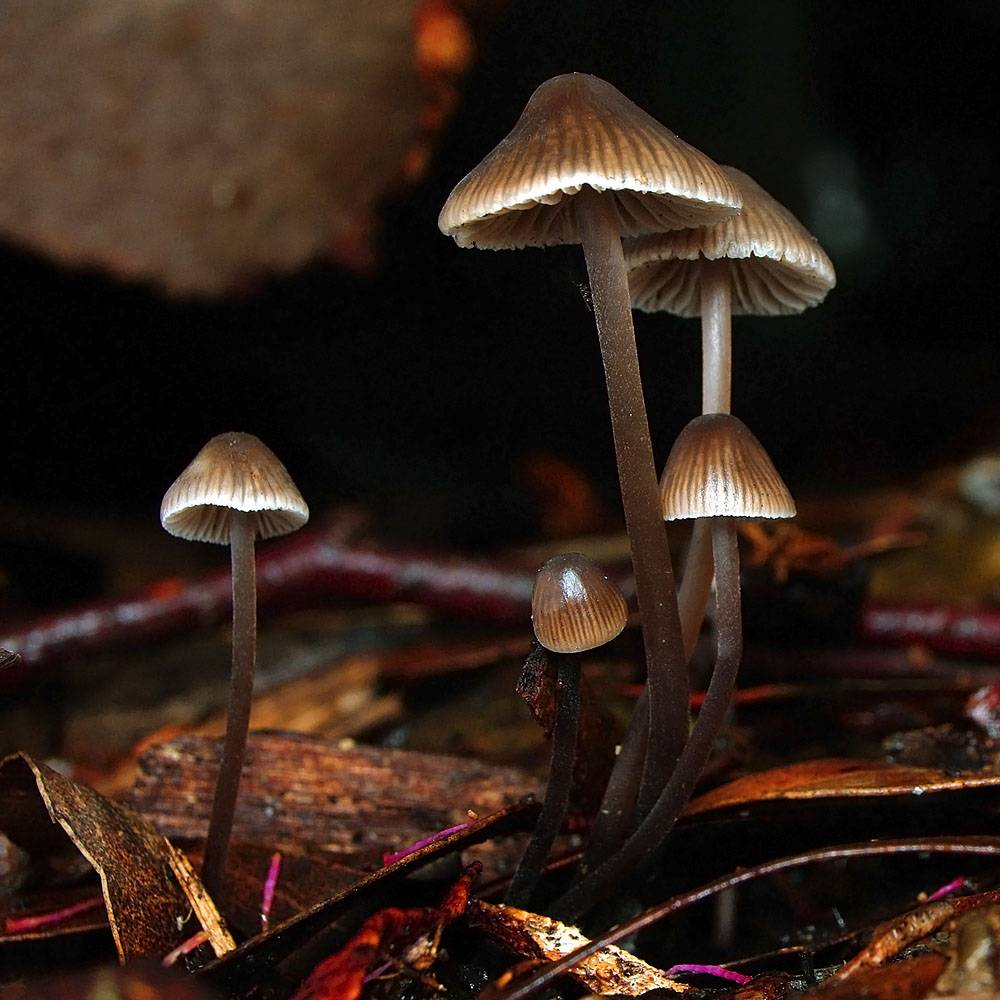

Scientific classification
- Domain: Eukaryota
- Kingdom: Fungi
- Division: Basidiomycota
- Class: Agaricomycetes
- Order: Agaricales
- Family: Mycenaceae
- Genus: Mycena
- Species: M. atrata

Binomial name
- Mycena atrata Grgur. (2003)

= Mycena atrata =

Species of fungus

Mycena atrata is a species of mushroom in the family Mycenaceae. Found in Australia, it was first mentioned in the literature by mycologists Cheryl Grgurinovic and A.A. Holland in 1982, but this was invalid according to the rules of botanical nomenclature (Article 36.1), as it lacked a formal description in Latin. In 2003, Grgurinovic formally described the species in her monograph on south-eastern Australian Mycena species.
