= Mycena alnicola =

Scientific classification
- Domain: Eukaryota
- Kingdom: Fungi
- Division: Basidiomycota
- Class: Agaricomycetes
- Order: Agaricales
- Family: Mycenaceae
- Genus: Mycena
- Species: M. alnicola

Binomial name
- Mycena alnicola (A.H. Smith.) (1941)

Synonyms
- Mycena alnicola var. odora A.H. Smith (1947)

Species of fungus

Mycena alnicola Mycological characteristics
- Gills on hymenium
- Cap is conical or campanulate
- Hymenium is adnate
- Stipe is bare
- Spore print is white
- Ecology is saprotrophic
- Edibility is inedible

Mycena alnicola, is a mushroom species in the family Mycenaceae. It usually grows in temperate forests, associated with alders. First described by A.H. Smith in the Olympic Mountains, Washington, USA. He remarks that the bluish-gray cast is more pronounced than usual. He also described a variety Mycena alnicola var. odora with an odor and taste raphanoid.

== Description ==
The cap is 1–2.5 cm wide. At first campanulate-obtuse, to convex at maturity. The pileus has a pale blue luster in younger specimens; the cap is hygrophanous. The cap disk is dark brown, and the rest of the cap is light brown (or beige), the margin usually whitish. The pileus margin is furrowed-striated.

The gills are adnate, interveined, and narrow to moderately broad. The gill color is gray and has entire ridges. The stem is 4–6 cm long × 1.5–2 mm wide, equal, hollow; covered with a dense white bloom in the stipe apex. The stipe color is dark beige to dark mouse gray, cap-colored at maturity. Smell and flavor is sweet.

Basidia with four sterigmata, basidiospores ellipsoid, smooth, amyloid, (6) 7–9 (10) × 4–5 μm. Cheilocystidia present, clavate to broadly fusiform; subcylindrical to spindle-shaped or sometimes with one or two protuberances; smooth or with low incrustation at apex in KOH. Cheilocystidia size range: 26–40 × 8–17 μm. Pleurocystida are rare.

=== Similar species ===
Mycena abramsii and Mycena leptocephala are similar but these species have bleach or chlorine odor.

=== Ecology ===
In wood and logs (usually from Alnus)
