= Mycena nidificata =

Scientific classification
- Kingdom: Fungi
- Division: Basidiomycota
- Class: Agaricomycetes
- Order: Agaricales
- Family: Mycenaceae
- Genus: Mycena
- Species: M. nidificata

Binomial name
- Mycena nidificata Har. Takah.
- Known only from Kanagawa, Japan

Species of fungus

Mycena nidificata Mycological characteristics
- Gills on hymenium
- Cap is conical
- Hymenium is adnate
- Stipe is bare
- Spore print is white
- Ecology is saprotrophic
- Edibility is unknown

Mycena nidificata is a species of fungus in the family Mycenaceae of the Agaricales. First collected in 2000 and reported as a new species in 2007, it is known only from Kanagawa, Japan, where it grows on the floor of oak forests. The dark brown irregularly wrinkled cap measures up to 25 mm (1.0 in) in diameter. The cap is supported by a thin stem up to 50 mm (2.0 in) long, which is covered at the base by a whitish hairlike growth, and attached to white, cord-like rhizomorphs—aggregations of mycelium that resemble plant roots. The underside of the cap features thin, distantly spaced grayish gills that have distinct veins running between them. At a microscopic level, distinguishing characteristics include the inamyloid spores (turning dark blue to black when stained with Melzer's reagent), the club-shaped cheilocystidia (cystidia on the gill edges) with finger-like appendages, the diverticulate cells in the outer layer of cap and stem, and the presence of clamp connections.

== Taxonomy, naming, and classification ==
Mycena nidificata was first collected in 2000 by Japanese mycologist Haruki Takahashi, and reported as new along with seven other Mycenas in a 2007 publication. The specific epithet is derived from the Latin word nidificata, meaning "nidificate"—"to make a nest". Its Japanese name is Yamiiro-kunugitake (ヤミイロクヌギタケ).

According to Takahashi, the inamyloid spores, the diverticulate cap cuticle hyphae, and the dark pigment in the gill hyphae suggest that the fungus is best classified in the section Hiemales of the genus Mycena. Because of its medium-sized, partly collybioid fruit bodies (i.e., small to medium-sized with white spore prints and convex caps, similar to species once placed in the genus Collybia), the white cord-like rhizomorphs, and its distinctly intervenose gills, it has an isolated position within the section.

== Description ==
The cap is initially conical to convex to bell-shaped, then flattened in age, ultimately reaching 10 to 25 mm (0.4 to 1.0 in) in diameter. The center of the cap is irregularly wrinkled to pitted, but less so toward the grooved margin. It is hygrophanous (changing color as it loses or absorbs water), dry, initially pruinose (covered with what appears to be a fine white powder), but soon becomes smooth. The color is blackish-brown at the center, dark brown to reddish-brown farther outward, and becoming much paler at the margin; sometimes the cap is evenly dark brown. The flesh is up to 1 mm thick and white, and does not have any distinctive taste and odor. The stem is 40 to 50 mm (1.6 to 2.0 in) long by 1.5 to 2 mm (0.059 to 0.079 in) wide, cylindrical, slightly enlarged at the base, central, slender, and hollow. The stem surface is dry, pruinose over the entire length, and does not become smooth with age. It is pale brownish at the top, and gradually becomes dark brown toward the base. The base is covered with a white mycelial hairlike growth (a tomentum) that is attached to white cord-like rhizomorphs on the substratum. The gills are fused to the stem, and distantly spaced, with between 15 and 18 gills reaching the stem. The gills are up to 2.5 mm broad, thin, grayish, and have distinct veins running between them. The gill edges are the same color as the gill faces.

=== Microscopic characteristics ===
The spores are roughly ellipsoid and measure 8–11 by 5–6 μm. They are smooth, colorless, inamyloid, and thin-walled. The basidia (the spore-bearing cells) are 28–35 by 7–8 μm, club-shaped, and mostly four-spored. The abundant cheilocystidia (cystidia on the gill edge) are club-shaped, measure 30–45 by 10–15 μm, and form a sterile gill edge. They have several irregularly cylindrical to knob-like apical appendages measuring 3–11 by 2–5 μm, which are colorless and thin-walled. Pleurocystidia (cystidia on the gill face) are absent in M. nidificata. The hymenophoral (hymenium-bearing) tissue is made of smooth, thin-walled hyphae that are 6–26 μm wide, cylindrical (but often inflated), and contain brownish pigment in the cytoplasm. These hyphae are dextrinoid, meaning they will turn reddish to reddish-brown in the presence of Melzer's reagent. The cap cuticle is made of parallel, bent-over hyphae that are 3–10 μm wide, cylindrical. The hyphae are smooth or covered with scattered, warty or finger-like diverticulae. Under the cap cuticle is a layer of parallel hyphae containing cytoplasmic brownish pigment. The hyphae are dextrinoid, and contain short and inflated cells that are up to 40 μm wide. The stem cuticle is made of parallel, bent-over hyphae 3–8 μm wide, which are similar in appearance to the hyphae of the cap cuticle. The caulocystidia (cystidia on the stem) are relatively sporadic; they are cylindrical, diverticulate, colorless, thin-walled, and measure 45–60 by 4–8 μm. The stem tissue is composed of longitudinally arranged, cylindrical hyphae that are 10–25 μm wide, dextrinoid, smooth, and have cytoplasmic brownish pigment. Clamp connections are present in the stem tissues, and at the septa at the bases of the basidia.

=== Similar species ===
Mycena granulifera, a species originally described from Brazil, is comparable to M. nidificata in having inamyloid spores, club-shaped cheilocystidia with finger-like outgrowths, and diverticulate cap cuticle hyphae. M. granulifera differs in forming a whitish, wrinkled cap and club-shaped to roughly spindle-shaped pleurocystidia. Mycena nidificata also bears some resemblance to the European species M. flos-nivium, which is distinguished by having cylindrical, amyloid spores, gills without veins between them, and an absence of cord-like rhizomorphs.

== Habitat and distribution ==
Mycena nidificata is known only from Kanagawa, Japan. The mushroom is found growing solitary or scattered, on dead fallen twigs in forests dominated by the oak species Quercus castanopsis. Fruiting occurs from May to September.
