= Mycena semivestipes =

Scientific classification
- Domain: Eukaryota
- Kingdom: Fungi
- Division: Basidiomycota
- Class: Agaricomycetes
- Order: Agaricales
- Family: Mycenaceae
- Genus: Mycena
- Species: M. semivestipes

Binomial name
- Mycena semivestipes (Peck) A.H.Sm. (1947)

Synonyms
- Omphalia semivestipes Peck (1895); Omphalina curvipes Peck (1907); Prunulus curvipes Murrill (1916); Prunulus semivestipes (Peck) Murrill (1916); Mycena subalcalina Atkinson (1918)

Species of fungus

Mycena semivestipes is a species of agaric fungus in the family Mycenaceae. It is found in eastern North America.

== Taxonomy ==
First described in 1895 as Omphalina semivestipes by Charles Horton Peck, the species was transferred to Mycena in 1947 by Alexander H. Smith. The type collection was made in Newfoundland, Canada.

== Description ==
The cap is initially convex to somewhat conical before flattening out in age; it attains a diameter of 0.8–3.5 cm (0.3–1.4 in) wide. The cap surface, smooth and slightly lubricous, is deep viscous to dark brown in the center. The margin is somewhat translucent, so that the grooves made by the gills are discernible. The thin flesh has a firm texture similar to cartilage, a distinct strong nitrous odor, and a mild to somewhat bitter taste. The gills have an adnate attachment, but often recede from the stipe as the mushroom matures. Their color is white to dirty pink. They can develop reddish-brown spots in age. Interspersed between the gills are two or three tiers of lamellae (short gills). The stipe measures 1.6–6 cm (0.6–2.4 in) long by 1–3 mm (0.04–0.12 in) thick, and is roughly the same thickness throughout its length. Its surface texture is smooth or lightly pruinose (as if dusted with a fine white powder), and it is dark brown at the base and whitish at the top. There can be fine hairs at the base, particularly in young specimens.

The spore print is white. Spores are thin walled, ellipsoid, hyaline (translucent), and measure 5–7 by 3–3.4 μm. They are amyloid. The basidia are four-spored, club shaped, and measure 21–30 by 4.5–5.4 μm. Cheilocystidia (cystidia on the gill edge) are club-shaped, hyaline to dark grey, and measure 24–34 by 5–11 μm.

== Habitat and distribution ==
Mycena semivestipes is a saprobic species that obtains nutrients from the decomposing logs and stumps of hardwoods, in which it fruits in dense clusters. Fruiting occurs in later fall and winter in eastern North America.
