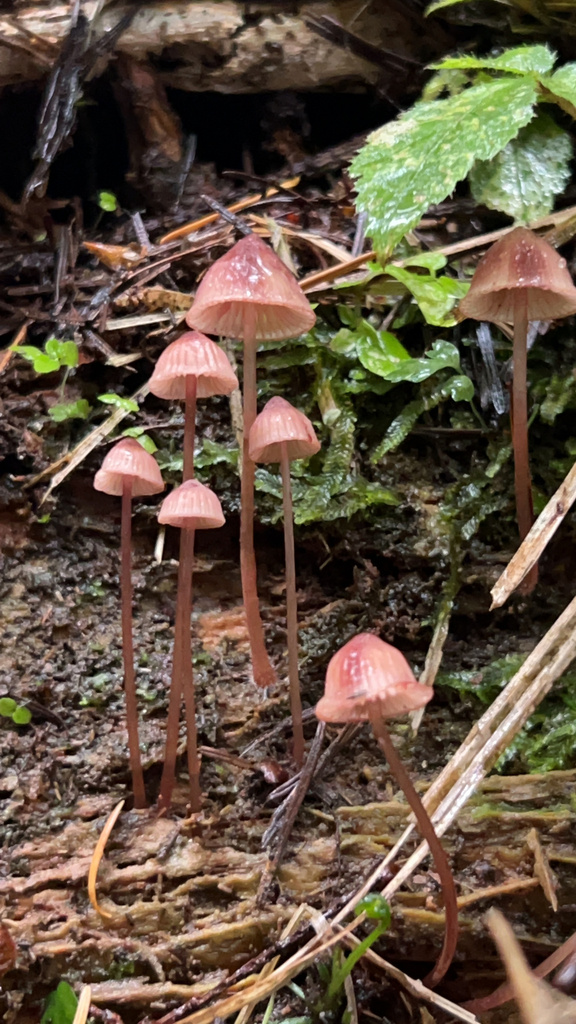

Scientific classification
- Kingdom: Fungi
- Division: Basidiomycota
- Class: Agaricomycetes
- Order: Agaricales
- Family: Mycenaceae
- Genus: Mycena
- Species: M. mariae

Binomial name
- Mycena mariae G.Stev.

= Mycena mariae =

Species of fungus

Mycena mariae is a species of fungus in the family Mycenaceae. The species was scientifically described by G. Stevenson and effectively published in 1964.

== Description ==
Mycena mariae mushrooms are distinguished by their dark red pigment and large, elongate spores. M. mariae has tissues are more pseudoamyloid than those of similar species such as Mycena morris-jonesii.

The cap of the mushroom is small, pink to red, with gills underneath. The stipe is hollow and darker at the base.

== Habitat and distribution ==
Mycena mariae mushrooms are typically found in litter under the canopy of a mixed podocarp forest.
