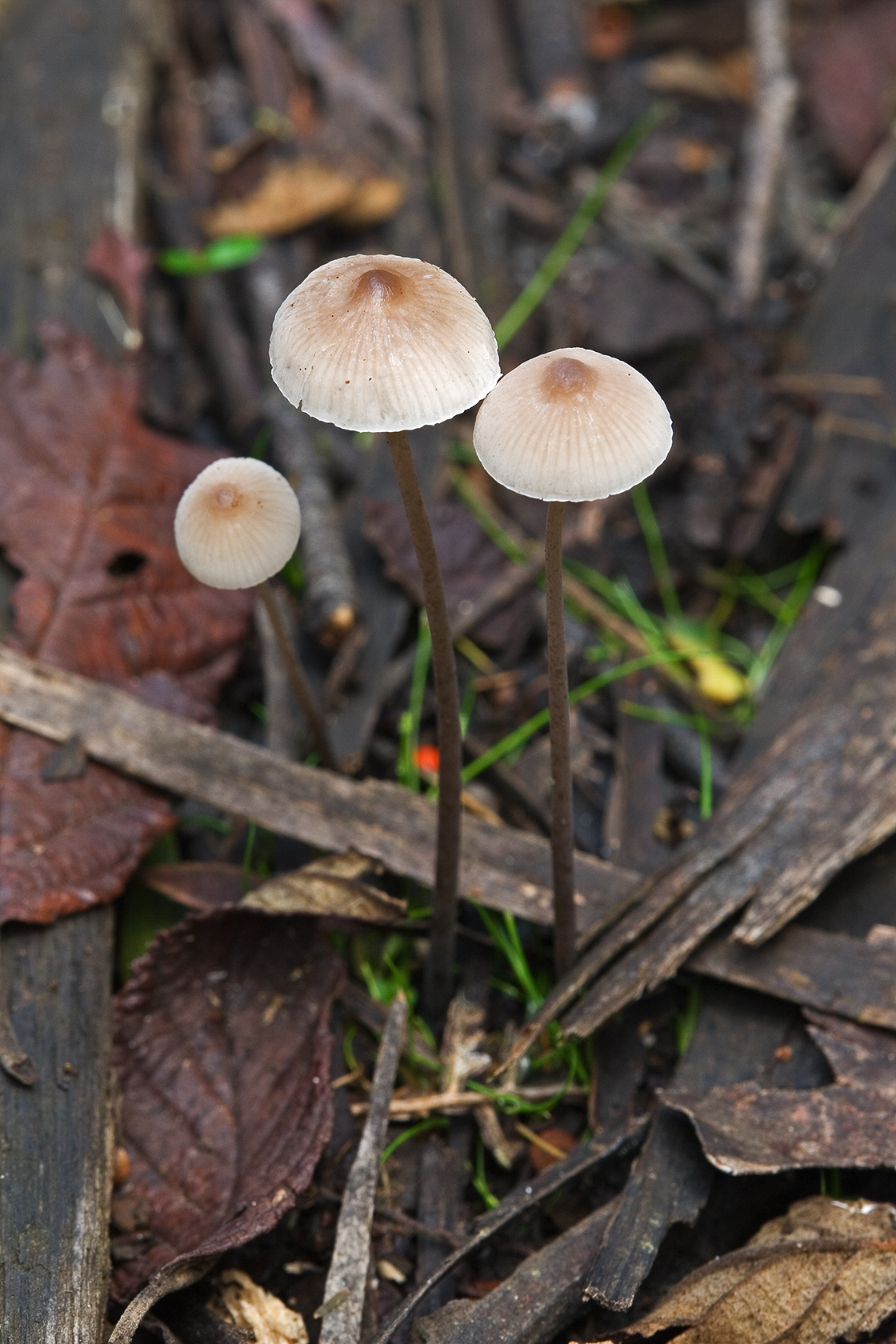

Scientific classification
- Kingdom: Fungi
- Division: Basidiomycota
- Class: Agaricomycetes
- Order: Agaricales
- Family: Mycenaceae
- Genus: Mycena
- Species: M. austrofilopes

Binomial name
- Mycena austrofilopes Grgur. (1997)

= Mycena austrofilopes =

Species of fungus

Mycena austrofilopes is a species of mushroom in the family Mycenaceae. It has been found growing in leaf litter under Eucalyptus trees in Victoria, Australia.
