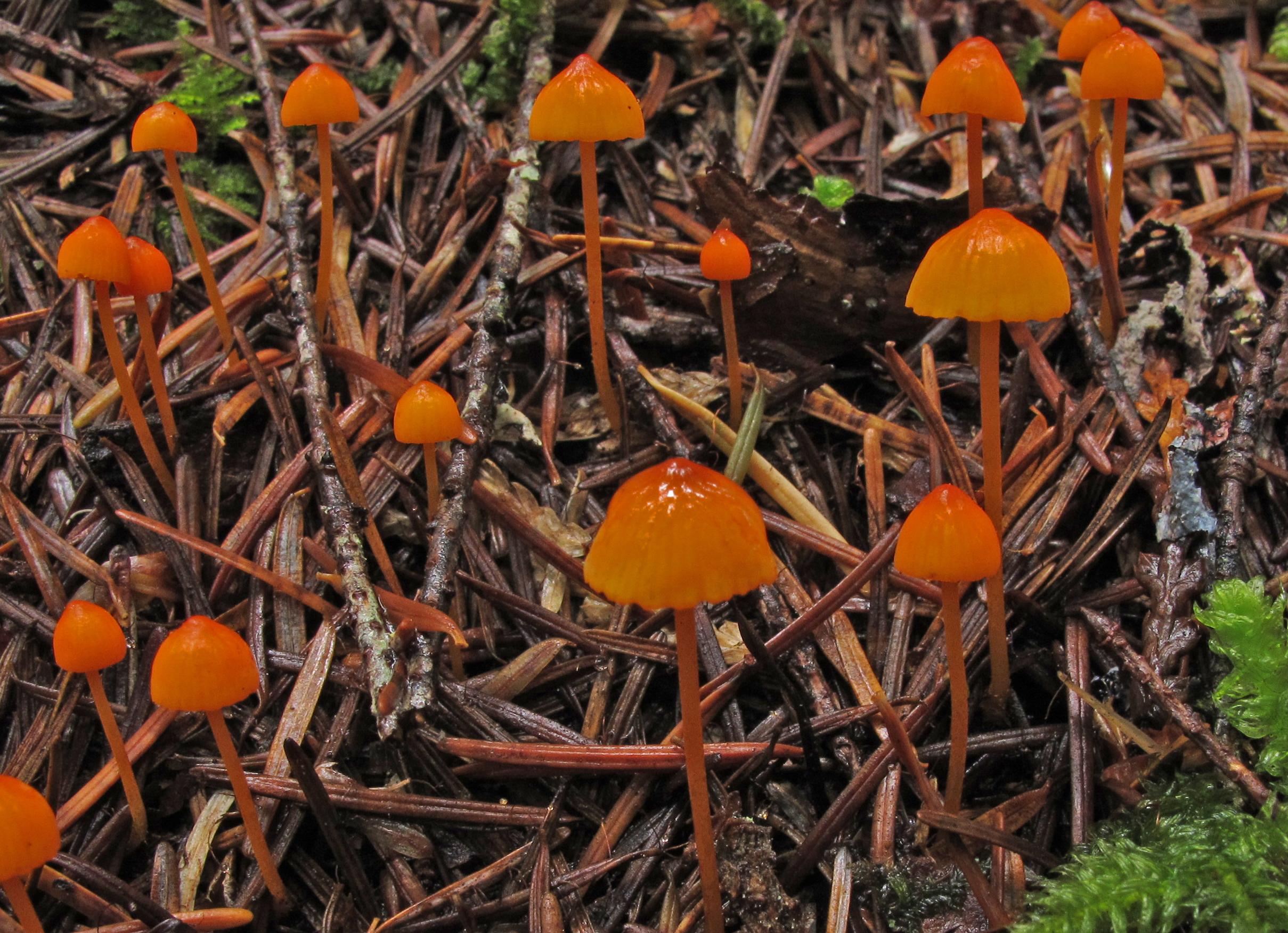

Scientific classification
- Kingdom: Fungi
- Division: Basidiomycota
- Class: Agaricomycetes
- Order: Agaricales
- Family: Mycenaceae
- Genus: Mycena
- Species: M. strobilinoides

Binomial name
- Mycena strobilinoides Peck (1893)

Synonyms
- Prunulus strobilinoides Murrill (1916); Prunulus aurantiacus Murrill (1916); Mycena aurantiaca Murrill (1916)

= Mycena strobilinoides =

Species of fungus

Mycena strobilinoides, commonly known as the flame mycena, or scarlet fairy helmet, is a species of agaric fungus in the family Mycenaceae.

The cap is up to 2 centimetres (3/4 in) wide, conical to bell-shaped, and smooth. It is initially red, then bright orange and paler shades. The stem is up to 6 cm (2 1/4 in) long and has long orange hairs, mostly at the base. The spores are amyloid, ellipsoid, and measure 7–9 by 4–5 μm. The spore print is white.

There are some similar species in the genus but they mostly differ in color.

It is found in North America, where it fruits scattered or in dense groups on needle beds and moss. It is more common in western than eastern North America and is also found in Europe. It prefers to grow at elevations greater than 760 metres (2,500 ft) in montane locales.
