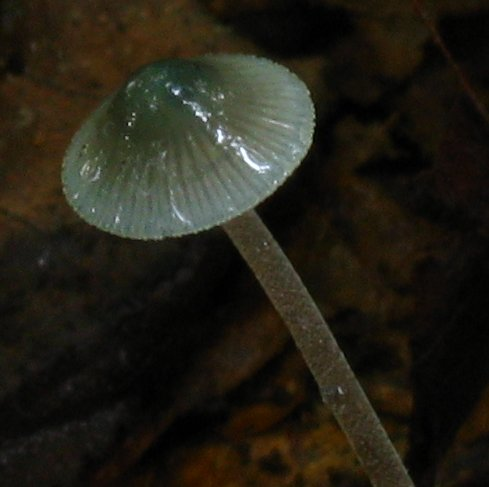

Scientific classification
- Domain: Eukaryota
- Kingdom: Fungi
- Division: Basidiomycota
- Class: Agaricomycetes
- Order: Agaricales
- Family: Mycenaceae
- Genus: Mycena
- Species: M. subcaerulea

Binomial name
- Mycena subcaerulea (Peck) Sacc. (1887)

Synonyms
- Agaricus subcaeruleus Peck (1873)

= Mycena subcaerulea =

Species of fungus

Mycena subcaerulea is a species of mushroom-forming fungus in the family Mycenaceae. It produces small, thin-fleshed fruitbodies with pale bluish-green caps upon slender stipes. The centers of the caps are darker in colour than the margins, and the cap cuticle can be peeled off. The fungus was first described in 1873 as Agaricus subcaeruleus by American mycologist Charles Horton Peck. His original collections, found growing on the trunks of decaying beech trees, were made in woods of the Adirondack Mountains in Upstate New York. Pier Andrea Saccardo transferred the species to the genus Mycena in 1887.
