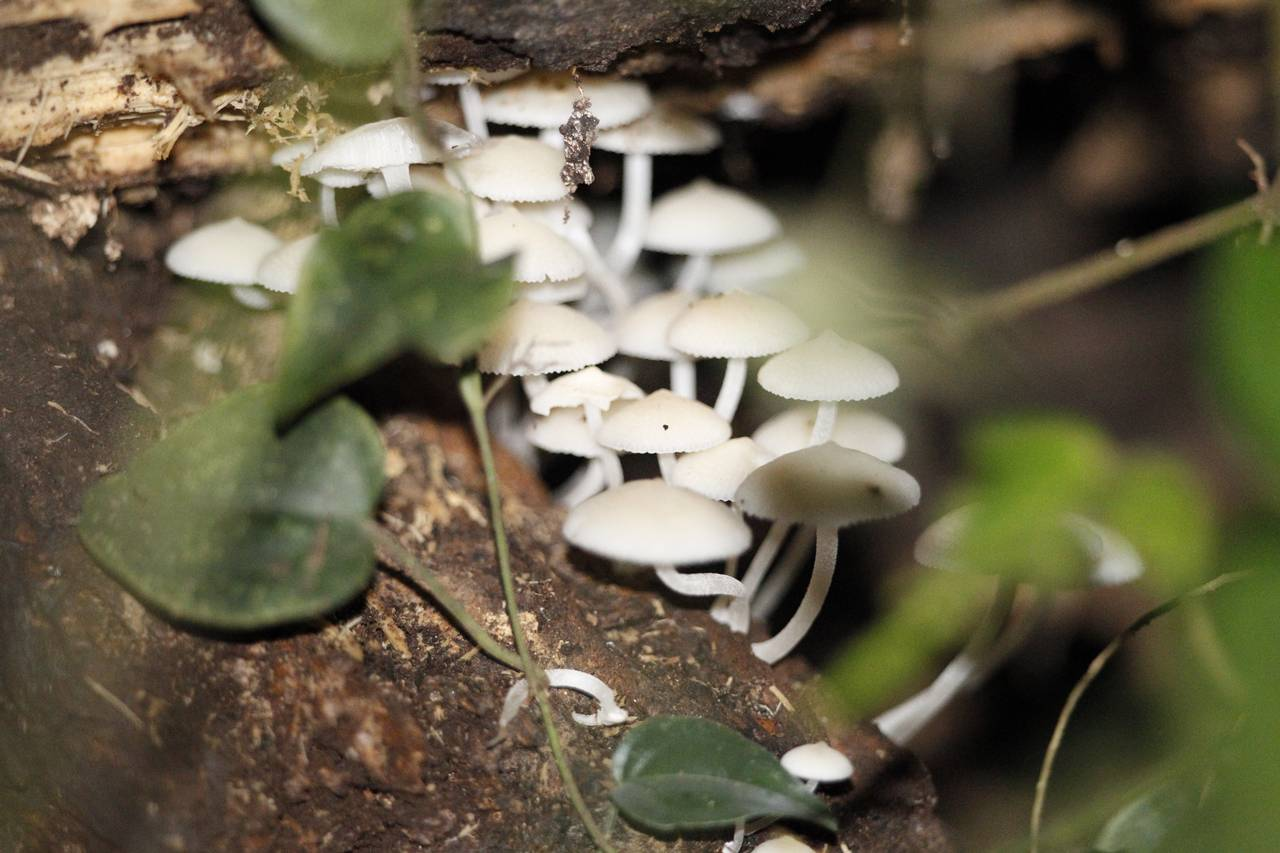
- Mycena illuminans

Scientific classification
- Kingdom: Fungi
- Division: Basidiomycota
- Class: Agaricomycetes
- Order: Agaricales
- Family: Mycenaceae
- Genus: Mycena
- Species: M. illuminans

Binomial name
- Mycena illuminans Henn. (1903)

= Mycena illuminans =

Species of fungus

Mycena illuminans is a species of agaric fungus in the family Mycenaceae. It was first found on the trunk of Calamus (palm) in Jawa, Indonesia. It is bioluminescent.

== See also ==
- List of bioluminescent fungi
