= Mycological Society of San Francisco =

Fungal interest club in the United States

- Abbreviation: MSSF
- Type: Amateur club
- Purpose: Promoting the understanding and enjoyment of fungi
- Headquarters: San Francisco Bay Area
- Main organ: Mycena News
- Website: Official MSSF Webpage

The Mycological Society of San Francisco (MSSF) is an amateur club based in the San Francisco Bay Area, "dedicated to promoting the understanding and enjoyment of fungi." Meetings are held every third Tuesday, and the society newsletter, Mycena News, is published once a month during the mushroom season, from September to May.

== Activities ==
In addition to the general meetings, members hold numerous formal and informal fungi-hunting "forays" throughout the year. The Society also hosts an annual "Fungus Fair" aimed at educating the general public with mushroom displays, identification booths, and fungus-oriented activities.

== Community ==
MSSF members often lend their expertise in mushroom identification to local authorities in possible poisoning cases. Since many of these occur to recent immigrants from countries with edible lookalikes, the Society has also produced a number of posters with pictures and warnings in multiple languages.

In line with their goals of promoting the enjoyment of fungi, members often consult with land management organizations and work to maintain the rights of the general public to collect mushrooms for study and recreational purposes on public lands.

== Membership ==
Membership is open to anyone interested in the study of fungi. Differing rates are offered for general membership, seniors, full-time students, and electronic members, who are not mailed the newsletter and instead download a PDF from the website.
