= List of Mycena species =

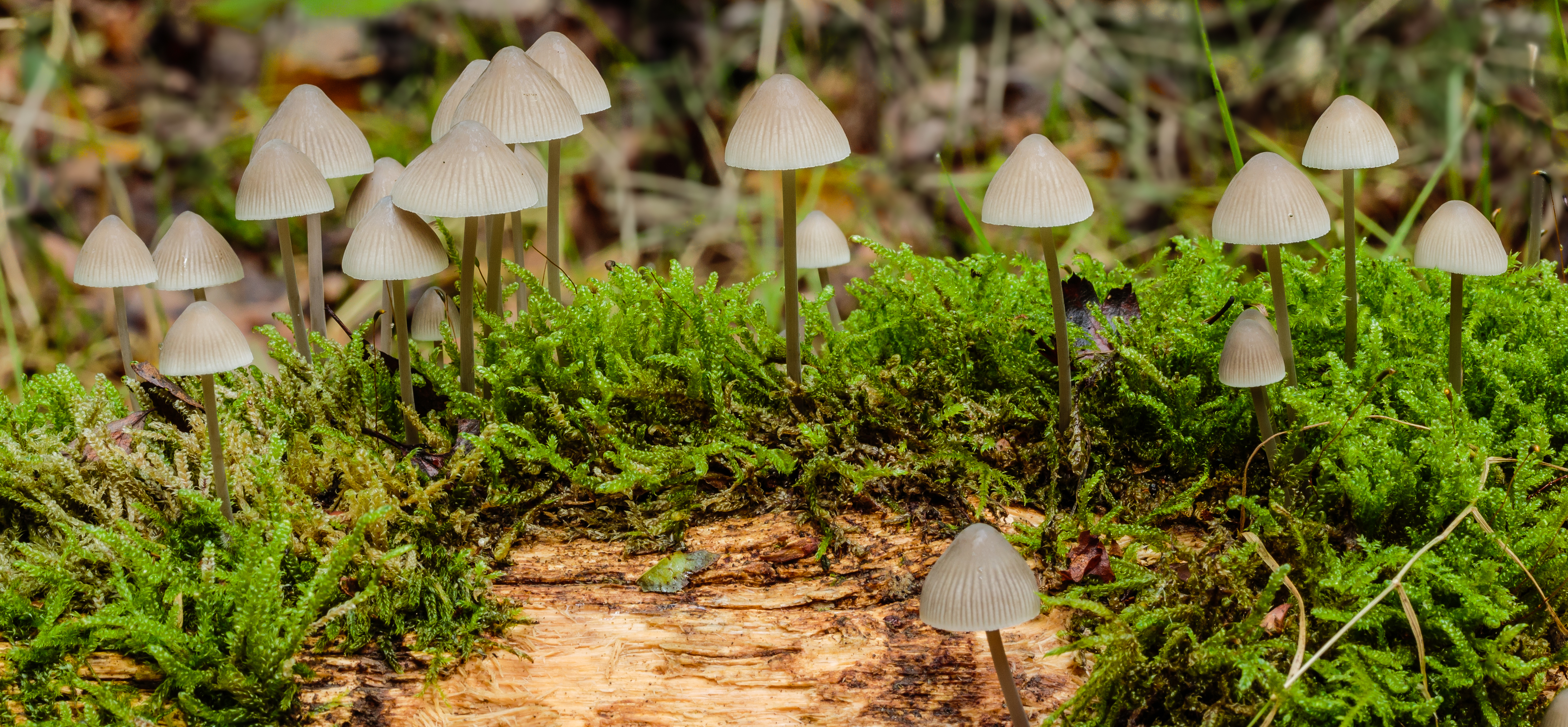
A group of Mycena on dead wood in Netherlands

This is a list of the fungus species in the genus Mycena. Many are plant pathogens.

As of 1 September 2023, the GBIF lists up to 1,431 species, while Species Fungorum lists about 1,340 species (out of 1,954 records). Around 600 species are accepted by Wijayawardene et al. 2020.

This list of name, authority and dates is based on the Species Fungorum list.

== A ==
- Mycena aberrans Robich (2016)
- Mycena abieticola Singer (1973)
- Mycena abietina Maas Geest. (1992)
- Mycena abietis Robich (2016)
- Mycena abramsii (Murrill) Murrill (1916)
- Mycena acadiensis Maas Geest. (1991)
- Mycena acanthophila J.C. Zamora & Català (2013)
- Mycena acicula (Schaeff.) P. Kumm. (1871)
- Mycena aciculata (A.H. Sm.) Desjardin & E. Horak (2002)
- Mycena aciculicola Robich (2016)
- Mycena aconquijensis Singer (1959)
- Mycena acrocephala Maas Geest. & E. Horak (1993)
- Mycena acrothele Maas Geest. & E. Horak (1995)
- Mycena aculeata Maas Geest. (1993)
- Mycena aculeifera Petch (1926)
- Mycena acuminata Métrod (1949)
- Mycena acuta Métrod (1949)
- Mycena acutifera Métrod (1949)
- Mycena adhaerens Velen. (1920)
- Mycena adirondackensis (Murrill) Murrill (1916)
- Mycena adnexa T. Bau & Q. Na (2021)
- Mycena adornata Maas Geest. & de Meijer (1997)
- Mycena aequatorialis Singer (1977)
- Mycena aeruginosa Beeli (1933)
- Mycena aetites (Fr.) Quél. (1872)
- Mycena agglutinatispora Métrod (1949)
- Mycena agloea Singer (1989)
- Mycena agrestis Aronsen & Maas Geest. (1997)
- Mycena alachuana (Murrill) Murrill (1945)
- Mycena alberoniensis Robich (2016)
- Mycena albibrunneola Corner (1994)
- Mycena albicans Métrod (1949)
- Mycena albiceps (Peck) Gilliam (1976)
- Mycena albida Robich (2016)
- Mycena albidoaquosa Robich (2005)
- Mycena albidoaquosipes Robich (2009)
- Mycena albidocapillaris Grgur. & T.W. May (1997)
- Mycena albidocinerea Velen. (1947)
- Mycena albidofusca Cleland (1933)
- Mycena albidogrisea Robich (2016)
- Mycena albidolilacea Kühner & Maire (1938)
- Mycena albidula (Peck) A.H. Sm. (1947)
- Mycena albinea Aravind. & Manim. (2015)
- Mycena albinobrunnea Robich (2016)
- Mycena albissima A.H. Sm. (1947)
- Mycena albitranslucens Corner (1994)
- Mycena alboaculeata Miersch & H. Lehmann (2015)
- Mycena albocinerea Velen. (1947)
- Mycena albogrisea Peck (1907)
- Mycena albolateritia Métrod (1949)
- Mycena alboradiata Miersch & Rödel (2014)
- Mycena albororida Maas Geest. & de Meijer (1997)
- Mycena albosordidula Robich (2016)
- Mycena albostriata Dennis (1970)
- Mycena alcaliniformis (Murrill) Murrill (1916)
- Mycena alcalinoides A. Pearson (1951)
- Mycena aleuriosma J. Favre (1957)
- Mycena alexandri Singer (1962)
- Mycena algeriensis Maire (1938)
- Mycena alnea Robich (2016)
- Mycena alnetanincola Robich (2016)
- Mycena alni Kalamees (1986)
- Mycena alnicola A.H. Sm. (1941)
- Mycena alniella Robich (2016)
- Mycena alniphila Robich (2003)
- Mycena alni-ramuli E. Campo & Robich (2016)
- Mycena alpestris Robich & G. Ricci (2016)
- Mycena alphitophora (Berk.) Sacc. (1887)
- Mycena amabilis Robich (2008)
- Mycena amala Aravind. & Manim. (2015)
- Mycena amazonica Singer (1983)
- Mycena ambigua Robich (2016)
- Mycena americana (A.H. Sm.) Singer (1973)
- Mycena amicta (Fr.) Quél. (1872)
- Mycena ammophilae-arenariae Robich (2016)
- Mycena angusta Robich (2005)
- Mycena anoectochili L. Fan & S.X. Guo (1997)
- Mycena anomala Beardslee (1924)
- Mycena antennae A.C. Cooper, Desjardin & B.A. Perry (2018)
- Mycena aosma Singer (1973)
- Mycena apala Aravind. & Manim. (2015)
- Mycena aphanes Aronsen & Gulden (2007)
- Mycena apiculispora Corner (1994)
- Mycena aquila Métrod (1949)
- Mycena aquivinosipes Robich (2016)
- Mycena araujae Singer (1983)
- Mycena arcangeliana Bres. (1904)
- Mycena argillacea (Murrill) Murrill (1916)
- Mycena argillascens Mitchel & A.H. Sm. (1978)
- Mycena aridiphila Cejp (1930)
- Mycena ariel Corner (1994)
- Mycena armeniaca Beeli (1927)
- Mycena armifera Maas Geest. & de Meijer (1997)
- Mycena aronsenii Maas Geest. (1993)
- Mycena aruna Aravind. & Manim. (2015)
- Mycena arundinarialis Pegler (1977)
- Mycena aschi Henn. (1901)
- Mycena aspratilis Maas Geest. & de Meijer (1997)
- Mycena aspromontana Robich (2016)
- Mycena asterina Desjardin, Capelari & Stevani (2007)
- Mycena asterophora Singer (1983)
- Mycena atava Velen. (1947)
- Mycena atkinsoniana A.H. Sm. (1947)
- Mycena atkinsonii House (1920)
- Mycena atrata Grgur. (2003)
- Mycena atribrunnea (Murrill) Murrill (1916)
- Mycena atridisca (Murrill) Murrill (1916)
- Mycena atroalboides (Peck) Sacc. (1887)
- Mycena atroavellanea Grgur. (2003)
- Mycena atrochalybaea Huijsman (1956)
- Mycena atrocyanea (Batsch) Gillet (1876)
- Mycena atrodiscus Henn. & E. Nyman (1899)
- Mycena atrofusca Velen. (1920)
- Mycena atroincrustata Singer (1969)
- Mycena atrorostrata Velen. (1947)
- Mycena atroumbonata Peck (1912)
- Mycena atrovinosa Robich (2003)
- Mycena atroviolacea R. Heim (1936)
- Mycena atrovirens Rea (1920)
- Mycena atrox Maas Geest. & de Meijer (1997)
- Mycena aurantiaca (Murrill) Murrill (1916)
- Mycena aurantiistipitata Robich & A. Gennari (2000)
- Mycena aurantiomarginata (Fr.) Quél. (1872)
- Mycena aurantiorubra Métrod (1949)
- Mycena aurea Beeli (1927)
- Mycena aurorea Maas Geest. & de Meijer (1997)
- Mycena auroricolor (Berk. & Broome) Petch (1945)
- Mycena austera Aronsen (1994)
- Mycena austinii (Peck) Kühner (1938)
- Mycena australiana Cleland (1931)
- Mycena austroalcalina Singer (1959)
- Mycena austroavenacea Singer (1969)
- Mycena austrocapillaris Singer (1962)
- Mycena austrofilopes Grgur. (1997)
- Mycena austromaculata Grgur. & T.W. May (1997)
- Mycena austropolygramma Raithelh. (1984)
- Mycena avellanea (Murrill) Murrill (1916)
- Mycena avellaneibrunnea Thiers (1958)
- Mycena avellaneigrisea (Murrill) Murrill (1916)
- Mycena avenacea (Fr.) Quél. (1872)

== B ==
- Mycena babruka Aravind. & Manim. (2013)
- Mycena baccatipes Métrod (1949)
- Mycena badiocarpa Pegler (1977)
- Mycena balanicola Velen. (1920)
- Mycena bambusae (Pat. & Demange) Zhu L. Yang (2000)
- Mycena bambusae-pygmaeae Robich (2006)
- Mycena bambusicola Murrill (1945)
- Mycena banksiae Cleland & Cheel (1919)
- Mycena baoensis T.J. Baroni & T.R. Armstr. (2004)
- Mycena barbata Velen. (1920)
- Mycena basibarbis Rick (1961)
- Mycena bathyrrhiza Maas Geest. (1992)
- Mycena belliarum (Johnst.) P.D. Orton (1960)
- Mycena bellula Métrod (1949)
- Mycena beluvensis Maas Geest. & Hauskn. (1996)
- Mycena bertaultiana G. Moreno & Heykoop (2001)
- Mycena betulina Velen. (1947)
- Mycena bhuglooi Robich & Hauskn. (2009)
- Mycena bicystidiata T. Bau & Q. Na (2019)
- Mycena bii Blanco-Dios (2021)
- Mycena bingensis Beeli (1933)
- Mycena biornata Singer (1973)
- Mycena bipindiensis Henn. (1901)
- Mycena blechnophila Singer (1965)
- Mycena bohemica Velen. (1947)
- Mycena boninensis (Berk. & M.A. Curtis) Singer (1973)
- Mycena borealis A.L. Sm. (1935)
- Mycena borellae Robich (2006)
- Mycena brachtensis Miersch (2012)
- Mycena brasiliensis Blanco-Dios (2021)
- Mycena bresadolana Robich & Neville (1998)
- Mycena brevicapillata Har. Takah. (2000)
- Mycena brevipes (Murrill) Murrill (1916)
- Mycena breviseta Höhn. (1909)
- Mycena brevisetosa Corner (1994)
- Mycena brevispina X. He & X.D. Fang (1994)
- Mycena broomeana {{{1}}}
- Mycena brownii A.H. Sm. (1947)
- Mycena brunaudiana Sacc. & Traverso (1911)
- Mycena brunnea (E. Ludw.) Olariaga, Pérez-De-Greg. & P. Arrill. (2015)
- Mycena brunneirotifera Corner (1994)
- Mycena brunneisetosa Corner (1994)
- Mycena brunneoalbida Robich (2016)
- Mycena brunneola J.Aug. Schmitt (2022)
- Mycena brunneolilacea Métrod (1949)
- Mycena brunneomarginata Robich (2002)
- Mycena brunneorubra Métrod (1949)
- Mycena brunneospinosa Desjardin (1995)
- Mycena brunneoviolacea A.C. Cooper, Desjardin & B.A. Perry (2018)
- Mycena bulbosa (Cejp) Kühner (1938)
- Mycena bullata Métrod (1949)
- Mycena bulliformis B.A. Perry & Desjardin (2016)

== C ==
- Mycena caesia Peck (1895)
- Mycena caesiialba (Murrill) Murrill (1916)
- Mycena caesiocana Singer (1969)
- Mycena caesioglutinosa Robich (2009)
- Mycena caespitosa Velen. (1947)
- Mycena cahaya A.L.C. Chew & Desjardin (2014)
- Mycena calamiphylla Corner (1994)
- Mycena calangianuensis Robich (2005)
- Mycena calceata Robich (1996)
- Mycena caliginosa Maas Geest. & Enderle (1994)
- Mycena calochroa Nezdojm. (1970)
- Mycena capillaripes Peck (1888)
- Mycena capillaris (Schumach.) P. Kumm. (1871)
- Mycena capillata Maas Geest. & de Meijer (1998)
- Mycena capillina Velen. (1947)
- Mycena capillofasciculata Robich (2016)
- Mycena capillus Velen. (1947)
- Mycena carbonicola (Murrill) Murrill (1916)
- Mycena caricicola (Lasch) Rydb. (1979)
- Mycena cariciophila Redhead (1980)
- Mycena carmeliana Grgur. (2003)
- Mycena carminis Singer (1973)
- Mycena carneofusca Malençon & Bertault ex Robich (2009)
- Mycena carneosanguinea Rea (1901)
- Mycena carolinensis A.H. Sm. & Hesler (1940)
- Mycena casta (MacOwan) D.A. Reid (1975)
- Mycena castanea Velen. (1947)
- Mycena castaneicola T. Bau & Q. Na (2019)
- Mycena castaneomarginata Singer (1989)
- Mycena castaneostipitata Singer (1989)
- Mycena catalaunica Robich (2003)
- Mycena caulopilosella Robich (2016)
- Mycena cayugaensis A.H. Sm. (1947)
- Mycena cecidiophila A.P. Berg, Berg-Block, Noordel. & Uljé (2000)
- Mycena cedretorum Maire (1928)
- Mycena celidocaulis Maas Geest. & E. Horak (1995)
- Mycena celtidis Raithelh. (1974)
- Mycena ceracea T. Bau & Q. Na (2021)
- Mycena cerasina Maas Geest. & de Meijer (1997)
- Mycena cervinialba (Murrill) Murrill (1916)
- Mycena cheboyganensis A.H. Sm. (1947)
- Mycena cheilosphaeroides Robich (2016)
- Mycena chlorantha (Fr.) P. Kumm. (1871)
- Mycena chloranthoides Maas Geest. (1984)
- Mycena chlorina (Henn.) Sacc. & P. Syd. (1902)
- Mycena chlorinosma Singer (1937)
- Mycena chlorocephala Pat. (1908)
- Mycena chlorodora Métrod (1949)
- Mycena chloroxantha Singer (1983)
- Mycena cholea A.H. Sm. (1934)
- Mycena choriophila Robich & G. Gasparini (2009)
- Mycena chrysanthemiformis Har. Takah. (2000)
- Mycena chrysites Maas Geest. & de Meijer (1997)
- Mycena chrysocorypha Singer (1938)
- Mycena chusqueophila Singer (1965)
- Mycena cicognanii Robich (2003)
- Mycena cilota (Speg.) Sacc. (1891)
- Mycena cimicaria Velen. (1920)
- Mycena cinchonensis (Murrill) Murrill (1916)
- Mycena cineracea Métrod (1949)
- Mycena cineracella Métrod (1949)
- Mycena cineraria A.H. Sm. (1947)
- Mycena cinereiavellanea (Murrill) Murrill (1916)
- Mycena cinerella (P. Karst.) P. Karst. (1879)
- Mycena cinereopileata Robich (2006)
- Mycena cineroides V. Hintikka (1963)
- Mycena cinnabarina Maas Geest. (1992)
- Mycena circaea Robich (2009)
- Mycena cirrhocephala (Berk. & Broome) Pegler (1977)
- Mycena cistophila G. Moreno & Heykoop (1998)
- Mycena citricolor (Berk. & M.A. Curtis) Sacc. (1887)
- Mycena citrinolamellata Herp. (1912)
- Mycena citrinomarginata Gillet (1876)
- Mycena citrinovirens M. Lange (1955)
- Mycena clariviolacea Har. Takah. (2007)
- Mycena clarkeana Grgur. (1997)
- Mycena clavicularis (Fr.) Gillet (1876)
- Mycena clavularis (Batsch) Sacc. (1887)
- Mycena clavus (L.) Rea (1922)
- Mycena clivicola Speg. (1926)
- Mycena cnaphocystis Singer (1989)
- Mycena coalita Maas Geest. (1992)
- Mycena coccinea Quél. (1880)
- Mycena coccineoides Grgur. (2003)
- Mycena codoniceps (Cooke) Sacc. (1891)
- Mycena coffearum Métrod (1949)
- Mycena collybiiformis (Murrill) Murrill (1916)
- Mycena comata Har. Takah. & Taneyama (2016)
- Mycena concolor (J.E. Lange) Kühner (1938)
- Mycena confinationis Ibarretxe, Fern.-Vic. & Arnedo (2020)
- Mycena conglobata Maas Geest. & Hauskn. (1996)
- Mycena congolensis Beeli (1927)
- Mycena congregabilis Miersch & Rödel (2010)
- Mycena conicoalba M. Villarreal & Esteve-Rav. (1999)
- Mycena conicola G. Stev. (1964)
- Mycena conidina Velen. (1947)
- Mycena conocephala Henn. (1901)
- Mycena conspersa Maas Geest. & de Meijer (1997)
- Mycena constans (Peck) Sacc. (1887)
- Mycena contulmensis Garrido (1988)
- Mycena convexa (Murrill) Dennis (1970)
- Mycena copiosa Cejp (1930)
- Mycena copriniformis Speg. (1921)
- Mycena coracina Maas Geest. (1988)
- Mycena coralliformis A.L.C. Chew & Desjardin (2014)
- Mycena corrugans Maas Geest. (1992)
- Mycena corrugata (Cleland & Cheel) Grgur. (2003)
- Mycena corticalis A.H. Sm. (1939)
- Mycena corticaticeps Kauffman & A.H. Sm. (1933)
- Mycena corticoides Robich (2016)
- Mycena corticola (Pers.) Gray (1821)
- Mycena cortinarioides Speg. (1898)
- Mycena corylina Robich (2016)
- Mycena corynephora Maas Geest. (1983)
- Mycena costaricensis Singer (1982)
- Mycena costata Velen. (1939)
- Mycena crassipes Massee (1899)
- Mycena crataegi Velen. (1939)
- Mycena cretata Aronsen (2009)
- Mycena crispatula Métrod (1949)
- Mycena cristinae J.S. Oliveira (2021)
- Mycena crocata (Schrad.) P. Kumm. (1871)
- Mycena crocea Maas Geest. (1991)
- Mycena cryptomeriicola Imazeki & Toki (1955)
- Mycena crystallina Peck (1888)
- Mycena cucullata (Ellis) Redhead (1984)
- Mycena culmigena Maas Geest. (1986)
- Mycena cunninghamiana Cleland (1933)
- Mycena cupressina Antonín & Maas Geest. (1998)
- Mycena cupressincola Robich (2016)
- Mycena cupressophila Robich (2016)
- Mycena cupulicola Issh. Tanaka (2003)
- Mycena curtipes Métrod (1949)
- Mycena cuspidata Massee (1902)
- Mycena cuspidatipilosa Lodge (1988)
- Mycena cuticolor (Murrill) Singer (1973)
- Mycena cyanea Velen. (1920)
- Mycena cyanella Singer (1969)
- Mycena cyaneobasis Peck (1898)
- Mycena cyanocephala Singer (1969)
- Mycena cyanorhiza Quél. (1875)
- Mycena cyanosyringea Singer (1982)
- Mycena cycadearum (Henn.) Sacc. & P. Syd. (1902)
- Mycena cylindrospora A.H. Sm. (1947)
- Mycena cyrnea Maas Geest. (1993)
- Mycena cystidifera Velen. (1920)
- Mycena cystidiosa (G. Stev.) E. Horak (1971)

== D ==
- Mycena dactylina Maas Geest. & de Meijer (1997)
- Mycena daisyogunensis Kobayasi (1951)
- Mycena dasypus Maas Geest. & Læssøe (1992)
- Mycena dealbata Velen. (1920)
- Mycena dealbatula T. Bau & Q. Na (2021)
- Mycena debiliformis Singer (1977)
- Mycena decembrina Velen. (1939)
- Mycena deceptor Maas Geest. (1988)
- Mycena decipiens Rick (1930)
- Mycena decora Maas Geest. (1986)
- Mycena deeptha Aravind. & Manim. (2012)
- Mycena deformata Velen. (1920)
- Mycena deformis Maas Geest. & de Meijer (1997)
- Mycena deightonii Beeli (1938)
- Mycena delica Singer (1989)
- Mycena delicata Aravind. & Manim. (2015)
- Mycena delvisoi Raithelh. (1980)
- Mycena demissa Maas Geest. & de Meijer (1997)
- Mycena dendrobii L. Fan & S.X. Guo (1999)
- Mycena dendrocystis E. Horak (1980)
- Mycena dennisii Singer (1955)
- Mycena denticulata Peck (1905)
- Mycena depilata Singer (1989)
- Mycena dermatogloea Desjardin, Boonprat. & Hywel-Jones (2003)
- Mycena desfontainiae Singer (1965)
- Mycena detrusa Maas Geest. & E. Horak (1995)
- Mycena deusta Maas Geest. & de Meijer (1997)
- Mycena dextrinocystis Pegler (1977)
- Mycena dicranolophus Maas Geest. (1995)
- Mycena digitalis Bres. (1907)
- Mycena digitata Maas Geest. & E. Horak (1995)
- Mycena diluta Métrod (1949)
- Mycena dinae Singer (1973)
- Mycena dinghuensis Z.S. Bi (1987)
- Mycena diplazii W.N. Chou (2019)
- Mycena discobasis Métrod (1949)
- Mycena discogena Singer (1962)
- Mycena discophora Corner (1994)
- Mycena discreta (Fr.) Sacc. (1887)
- Mycena dissiliens (Fr.) P. Karst. (1879)
- Mycena dissimilis Maas Geest. & de Meijer (1997)
- Mycena dissimulata Métrod (1949)
- Mycena distincta (Manim. & Leelav.) Aravind. & Manim. (2015)
- Mycena diversa Maas Geest. & de Meijer (1997)
- Mycena diversicystidiata Miersch & Rödel (2014)
- Mycena dobraensis Robich & Hauskn. (2008)
- Mycena domingensis Dennis (1961)
- Mycena drepanocladi (Singer) Singer (1962)
- Mycena dryopteridis Singer (1962)
- Mycena dryopteriphila Lj.N. Vassiljeva & M.M. Nazarova (1973)
- Mycena dumontii Singer (1989)
- Mycena dunicola M. Villarreal, Esteve-Rav., Barrasa & A. Ortega (2001)
- Mycena dura Maas Geest. & Hauskn. (1994)

== E ==
- Mycena ealaensis Beeli (1928)
- Mycena eburnea Maas Geest. (1988)
- Mycena eburneopileata Robich (2006)
- Mycena echinocephala (G.F. Atk.) Desjardin (1993)
- Mycena egregia Maas Geest. (1989)
- Mycena elegantissima Robich (2016)
- Mycena elegantula Peck (1895)
- Mycena elongata Maas Geest. & de Meijer (1997)
- Mycena emeritensis Dennis (1961)
- Mycena endoglobulosa Singer (1977)
- Mycena entolomoides T. Bau (2018)
- Mycena epicastanea Robich (2016)
- Mycena epigeios Velen. (1939)
- Mycena epipterygia (Scop.) Gray (1821)
- Mycena epipterygioides A. Pearson (1919)
- Mycena erianthi-ravennae Robich & M. Marchetti (1999)
- Mycena erminea Maas Geest. (1993)
- Mycena erubescens Höhn. (1913)
- Mycena eucalyptigena Robich (2016)
- Mycena eucalyptina Robich (2007)
- Mycena eucalyptiphila Robich (2008)
- Mycena eucalyptorum Cleland (1933)
- Mycena eucryphiarum Singer (1969)
- Mycena eucystidiata Höhn. (1914)
- Mycena exalbida Métrod (1949)
- Mycena excedens Métrod (1949)
- Mycena excelsa Maas Geest. & de Meijer (1997)
- Mycena excentralis Métrod (1949)
- Mycena excentrica Métrod (1949)
- Mycena exigua Maas Geest. & de Meijer (1997)
- Mycena exilis Aronsen & Gulden (2007)
- Mycena extenuata Maas Geest. & de Meijer (1998)
- Mycena ezeizae Raithelh. (1984)

== F ==
- Mycena fagetorum (Fr.) Gillet (1876)
- Mycena fagicola A.H. Sm. (1935)
- Mycena faginea Robich (2010)
- Mycena fallax A.H. Sm. (1950)
- Mycena falsidica E. Horak (1980)
- Mycena farinacea (Murrill) Murrill (1916)
- Mycena farinella (Feltgen) Sacc. & Trotter (1912)
- Mycena farinosa Petch (1926)
- Mycena fasciculata Beeli (1927)
- Mycena favrei Maas Geest. (1991)
- Mycena februaria Singer (1959)
- Mycena fenestrata Maas Geest. & de Meijer (1997)
- Mycena fera Maas Geest. & de Meijer (1997)
- Mycena fernandeziana Singer (1962)
- Mycena festucae Velen. (1939)
- Mycena filicina (Dennis) Dennis (1970)
- Mycena filiformis A.H. Sm. (1947)
- Mycena filipes Raithelh. (1974)
- Mycena filopes (Bull.) P. Kumm. (1871)
- Mycena fimetaria (Murrill) Singer (1973)
- Mycena fissilis Métrod (1949)
- Mycena flagellata H. Cochard, D. Ghyselinck & P.-A. Moreau (2019)
- Mycena flammifera Har. Takah. & Taneyama (2016)
- Mycena flavescens Velen. (1920)
- Mycena flavifolia Peck (1913)
- Mycena flavocitrina (Murrill) Murrill (1916)
- Mycena flavofuliginosa Robich (2006)
- Mycena flocculentipes Huijsman (1958)
- Mycena flocculina (Kalamees) M. Villarreal (1998)
- Mycena floris-castaneae Dähncke & Robich (2010)
- Mycena flos-alba Pat. (1917)
- Mycena flos-nivium Kühner (1952)
- Mycena foliicola Métrod (1949)
- Mycena foliorum Métrod (1949)
- Mycena follicystidiata Raithelh. (1986)
- Mycena fonticola Har. Takah. (2007)
- Mycena fontqueri Maire (1933)
- Mycena fragillima A.H. Sm. (1939)
- Mycena fraxinea Velen. (1947)
- Mycena frondaria Métrod (1949)
- Mycena fuhreri Grgur. (2003)
- Mycena fulgoris Cortés-Pérez & Desjardin (2019)
- Mycena fuliginea Maas Geest. & de Meijer (1998)
- Mycena fuligineipapillata Robich (2003)
- Mycena fuliginella A.H. Sm. (1947)
- Mycena fuliginosa (Murrill) Murrill (1916)
- Mycena fumosa Grgur. (2003)
- Mycena fumosiavellanea (Murrill) Murrill (1916)
- Mycena furcatifolia Corner (1994)
- Mycena furfuracea Aravind. & Manim. (2015)
- Mycena furva Maas Geest. & de Meijer (1997)
- Mycena fusca Cleland (1933)
- Mycena fuscescens Velen. (1920)
- Mycena fuscinea Maas Geest. & de Meijer (1998)
- Mycena fuscoaquosipes Robich (2003)
- Mycena fuscoaurantiaca Har. Takah. (2007)
- Mycena fuscocystidiata Singer (1989)
- Mycena fuscoocula A.H. Sm. (1937)
- Mycena fuscopurpurea Henn. (1901)
- Mycena fuscoradiata Maas Geest. & Hauskn. (1998)
- Mycena fuscororida Maas Geest. & de Meijer (1997)
- Mycena fuscoumbilicata Robich & Cochard (2016)
- Mycena fuscovinacea G. Stev. (1964)
- Mycena fusipes (Murrill) Murrill (1916)
- Mycena fuyoensis S. Imai (1941)

== G ==
- Mycena gackstatteri Raithelh. (1972)
- Mycena galericulata (Scop.) Gray (1821)
- Mycena galeriformis Velen. (1947)
- Mycena galerina Corner (1994)
- Mycena galopus (Pers.) P. Kumm. (1871)
- Mycena gaultheri A.H. Sm. (1947)
- Mycena geesterani Heykoop, Esteve-Rav. & G. Moreno (1992)
- Mycena gelatinomarginata Lodge (1988)
- Mycena gelatinosa Métrod (1949)
- Mycena generosa Maas Geest. & de Meijer (1997)
- Mycena gentilis Maas Geest. (1992)
- Mycena gerhardi Raithelh. (1995)
- Mycena gigantospora Massee (1899)
- Mycena gilvipes M. Villarreal, Heykoop & Maas Geest. (1998)
- Mycena gladiocystis Esteve-Rav. & A. Ortega (1999)
- Mycena glaesisetosa A. Cortés-Pérez, Desjardin & B.A. Perry (2019)
- Mycena glatfelteri (Peck) Murrill (1917)
- Mycena glaucopa Velen. (1920)
- Mycena glaucophylla Métrod (1949)
- Mycena globata Maas Geest. & de Meijer (1997)
- Mycena globispora (Manim. & Leelav.) Aravind. & Manim. (2015)
- Mycena globuliformis Segedin (1991)
- Mycena globulispora Maas Geest. & de Meijer (1997)
- Mycena gloeoloma Singer (1989)
- Mycena gloiocyanea (G.F. Atk.) Murrill (1917)
- Mycena glutinocothurnata Singer (1989)
- Mycena glutinosa Beardslee (1934)
- Mycena goarensis Robich (2016)
- Mycena gombakensis A.L.C. Chew & Desjardin (2014)
- Mycena gomezii Singer (1989)
- Mycena goossensiae Beeli (1927)
- Mycena gracilipes (Murrill) Murrill (1916)
- Mycena graciosa Beeli (1924)
- Mycena graminea (Cejp) Kühner (1938)
- Mycena graminicola Robich (2003)
- Mycena graminum Robich (2006)
- Mycena grantii (Murrill) Murrill (1916)
- Mycena granulifera Maas Geest. & de Meijer (1997)
- Mycena granulosa Henn. (1899)
- Mycena graveolens Kauffman & A.H. Sm. (1933)
- Mycena gregalis Métrod (1949)
- Mycena grisea Petch (1926)
- Mycena griseiconica Kauffman (1930)
- Mycena griseinitrosa Corner (1994)
- Mycena grisellina J. Favre (1960)
- Mycena griseogilva E. Horak (1963)
- Mycena griseolilacea Maas Geest. & E. Horak (1995)
- Mycena griseopallida Robich (2016)
- Mycena griseoradiata Singer (1989)
- Mycena griseoradiatella Singer (1989)
- Mycena griseorete Singer (1962)
- Mycena griseotincta T. Bau & Q. Na (2019)
- Mycena griseoviolacea Métrod (1949)
- Mycena griseoviridis A.H. Sm. (1947)
- Mycena guldeniana Aronsen & B.A. Perry (2011)
- Mycena guzmanii Cortés-Pérez, Desjardin & B.A. Perry (2019)

== H ==
- Mycena haematopus (Pers.) P. Kumm. (1871)
- Mycena hamata Métrod (1949)
- Mycena handkeana Miersch, Penke & Robich (2006)
- Mycena haushoferi Robich, Miersch & Karasch (2005)
- Mycena hausknechtii Maas Geest. (1993)
- Mycena hawaiiensis Desjardin (1995)
- Mycena helminthobasis Singer (1969)
- Mycena helvetica Blanco-Dios (2021)
- Mycena hemisphaerica Peck (1894)
- Mycena hemisphaericopapillata Métrod (1949)
- Mycena hemitrichialis Singer (1989)
- Mycena hepatica M. Villarreal, Heykoop & Maas Geest. (1999)
- Mycena hepaticarum Dennis (1961)
- Mycena herbarum Singer (1943)
- Mycena heroica Singer (1959)
- Mycena heterocystis Velen. (1947)
- Mycena heterotrama Singer (1973)
- Mycena hiemaloides Miersch & Dähncke (2011)
- Mycena himalayana Rawla (1991)
- Mycena hinnulea Maas Geest. & E. Horak (1995)
- Mycena holoporphyra (Berk. & M.A. Curtis) Singer (1962)
- Mycena hondurensis A.H. Sm. (1939)
- Mycena horizontalis Velen. (1947)
- Mycena horrida Métrod (1949)
- Mycena hudsoniana A.H. Sm. (1941)
- Mycena humilis Rick (1938)
- Mycena hyalina A. Pearson (1951)
- Mycena hyalinostipitata T. Bau & Q. Na (2019)
- Mycena hyalinotricha Singer (1969)
- Mycena hyalocaulina Robich (2016)
- Mycena hydropodoides Singer (1989)
- Mycena hygrophora G. Stev. (1964)
- Mycena hygrophoroides T. Bau & Q. Na (2019)
- Mycena hylophila Maas Geest. & de Meijer (1998)
- Mycena hypoxera (Singer) Raithelh. (1984)
- Mycena hypsizyga Singer (1969)

== I ==
- Mycena icterinoides Singer (1989)
- Mycena idroboi Singer (1973)
- Mycena igapoensis Singer (1989)
- Mycena illita Corner (1994)
- Mycena illuminans Henn. (1903)
- Mycena impexa Maas Geest. & de Meijer (1997)
- Mycena inaequalis Robich (2016)
- Mycena incana Maas Geest. & E. Horak (1995)
- Mycena incarnatifolia A.H. Sm. (1947)
- Mycena incarnativelum Desjardin (1995)
- Mycena inclinata (Fr.) Quél. (1872)
- Mycena incongruens (Britzelm.) Sacc. & Traverso (1911)
- Mycena inconspicua L. Krieg. (1927)
- Mycena incurvipes Métrod (1949)
- Mycena indica Sarwal & Rawla (1983)
- Mycena indigotica C.L. Wei & R. Kirschner (2018)
- Mycena indikensis Pérez-de-Greg. & Robich (2016)
- Mycena infuscata Maas Geest. & de Meijer (1997)
- Mycena inopinata Maas Geest. (1986)
- Mycena insignis A.H. Sm. (1941)
- Mycena insipida Rick (1961)
- Mycena insolita Maas Geest. & de Meijer (1997)
- Mycena insueta Grgur. (2003)
- Mycena insularis (Speg.) Sacc. (1891)
- Mycena interrupta (Berk.) Sacc. (1887)
- Mycena intersecta Har. Takah. (2007)
- Mycena intervenosa Métrod (1949)
- Mycena invisibilis Joss. ex Maas Geest. (1983)
- Mycena ionocephala Singer (1989)
- Mycena ixoleuca Singer (1973)
- Mycena ixoxantha Singer (1973)

== J ==
- Mycena jacobi Maire (1930)
- Mycena jatila Aravind. & Manim. (2014)
- Mycena jingyinga C.C. Chang, C.Y. Chen, W.W. Lin & H.W. Kao (2020)
- Mycena juaniicola Singer (1962)
- Mycena judithiana Bougher (2009)
- Mycena juniana Velen. (1947)
- Mycena juniperi Robich (2016)
- Mycena juniperifoliae Ibarretxe, Fern.-Vic. & Arnedo (2020)
- Mycena juniperina Aronsen (1996)
- Mycena junquillina Dennis (1961)

== K ==
- Mycena kamala Aravind. & Manim. (2015)
- Mycena kanika Aravind. & Manim. (2015)
- Mycena kapila Aravind. & Manim. (2015)
- Mycena kapotha Aravind. & Manim. (2015)
- Mycena kauffmaniana A.H. Sm. (1947)
- Mycena kerandi Speg. (1898)
- Mycena kermesina Singer (1986)
- Mycena khonkhem Desjardin, Boonprat. & Hywel-Jones (2002)
- Mycena kuehneri Singer (1943)
- Mycena kuehneriana A.H. Sm. (1947)
- Mycena kurramulla Grgur. (1997)
- Mycena kuthanii Singer (1989)
- Mycena kuurkacea Grgur. (2003)
- Mycena kyeema Grgur. (1997)

== L ==
- Mycena lacrimans Singer (1989)
- Mycena ladae Velen. (1947)
- Mycena laevigatoides Maas Geest. (1988)
- Mycena laevispora Velen. (1947)
- Mycena lammiensis Harmaja (1985)
- Mycena lanceifera Robich (2016)
- Mycena lanipes Maas Geest. & E. Horak (1995)
- Mycena lanosipes Métrod (1949)
- Mycena lanuginosa Har. Takah. (2007)
- Mycena lanuginosipes Métrod (1949)
- Mycena lapalmaensis Dähncke & Robich (2010)
- Mycena laricina Velen. (1939)
- Mycena lasiopus Maas Geest. & de Meijer (1998)
- Mycena laskibarii Robich (2016)
- Mycena latens Corner (1994)
- Mycena latericia (Murrill) Murrill (1916)
- Mycena lateritia Velen. (1920)
- Mycena latifolia (Peck) A.H. Sm. (1935)
- Mycena latitabunda Robich & Mei (2016)
- Mycena laxa Velen. (1920)
- Mycena lazoi Singer (1969)
- Mycena lazulina Har. Takah., Taneyama, Terashima & Oba (2016)
- Mycena leaiana (Berk.) Sacc. (1891)
- Mycena lecythidacearum Singer (1989)
- Mycena legionaria Velen. (1939)
- Mycena lepida Maas Geest. & de Meijer (1997)
- Mycena lepiotiformis (Murrill) Murrill (1916)
- Mycena leptocephala (Pers.) Gillet (1876)
- Mycena leucophaea (Murrill) Murrill (1916)
- Mycena leucosetosa Miersch (2012)
- Mycena leucoxantha Singer (1973)
- Mycena lignivora Maas Geest. (1995)
- Mycena lilliria Grgur. (1997)
- Mycena limonia Maas Geest. (1995)
- Mycena lineata (Bull.) P. Kumm. (1871)
- Mycena litoralis A.H. Sm. (1947)
- Mycena lividorubra Segedin (1991)
- Mycena lohitha Aravind. & Manim. (2013)
- Mycena lohwagii Singer (1929)
- Mycena lomamaya Aravind. & Manim. (2014)
- Mycena lomavritha Manim. (2011)
- Mycena lomaza Aravind. & Manim. (2015)
- Mycena longicrinita Singer (1989)
- Mycena longinqua A.C. Cooper, Desjardin & B.A. Perry (2018)
- Mycena longipes (Murrill) Murrill (1916)
- Mycena longiseta Höhn. (1909)
- Mycena longispora Rick (1938)
- Mycena lucentipes Desjardin, Capelari & Stevani (2007)
- Mycena luguensis C.C. Chang, C.Y. Chen, W.W. Lin & H.W. Kao (2020)
- Mycena lumina Cortés-Pérez, Desjardin & Rockefeller (2019)
- Mycena luteimarginata Robich & De Ruvo (2016)
- Mycena luteoalcalina Singer (1929)
- Mycena luteola Maas Geest. & de Meijer (1997)
- Mycena luteopallida Robich (2016)
- Mycena luteopurpurea Rick (1938)
- Mycena luteorosea Beeli (1933)
- Mycena luteovariegata Harder & Læssøe (2013)
- Mycena luxaeterna Desjardin, B.A. Perry & Stevani (2010)
- Mycena luxarboricola Desjardin, B.A. Perry & Stevani (2010)
- Mycena lux-coeli Corner (1954)
- Mycena luxfoliata Har. Takah., Taneyama & Terashima (2016)
- Mycena luxfoliicola Cortés-Pérez, Desjardin & Ram.-Cruz (2019)
- Mycena luxperpetua Desjardin, B.A. Perry & Lodge (2010)

== M ==
- Mycena macilenta H.E. Bigelow (1976)
- Mycena mackinawensis A.H. Sm. (1953)
- Mycena macrocystidiata Singer (1936)
- Mycena maculata P. Karst. (1890)
- Mycena madecassensis R. Heim ex Métrod (1949)
- Mycena madorophila H.E. Bigelow (1976)
- Mycena madronicola A.H. Sm. (1939)
- Mycena magna (Murrill) Murrill (1916)
- Mycena magnicystidiosa Robich & Ayer (2016)
- Mycena majalis S. Lundell (1941)
- Mycena malafidensis Robich (2011)
- Mycena maldea Grgur. (1997)
- Mycena mamaku Segedin (1991)
- Mycena mammillata (Pass.) Sacc. (1887)
- Mycena mandaiensis Corner (1994)
- Mycena marangania Grgur. (1997)
- Mycena marasmielloides Desjardin & Hemmes (2011)
- Mycena marasmius (Murrill) Murrill (1940)
- Mycena margarita (Murrill) Murrill (1916)
- Mycena mariae G. Stev. (1964)
- Mycena marocana Maas Geest. (1983)
- Mycena maura Maire (1928)
- Mycena maurella Robich (1992)
- Mycena mcmurphyi (Murrill) A.H. Sm. (1947)
- Mycena megaspora Kauffman (1933)
- Mycena melandeta Singer (1973)
- Mycena meliigena (Berk. & Cooke) Sacc. (1887)
- Mycena melina Velen. (1920)
- Mycena melinocephala Singer (1973)
- Mycena mellea Lj.N. Vassiljeva (1973)
- Mycena melleodisca (Murrill) Murrill (1916)
- Mycena metata (Fr.) P. Kumm. (1871)
- Mycena metuloidifera Singer (1969)
- Mycena meulenhoffiana Oort (1928)
- Mycena meyeri-ludovici (Eichelb.) Sacc. & Trotter (1912)
- Mycena microhygrotrama Corner (1994)
- Mycena microjonia Singer (1989)
- Mycena microleuca Singer (1965)
- Mycena microleucoides Singer (1989)
- Mycena micromamma Speg. (1921)
- Mycena micromelaena Singer (1989)
- Mycena micromphale Singer (1952)
- Mycena micropolia Singer (1989)
- Mycena microspora Velen. (1920)
- Mycena microstena Singer (1989)
- Mycena microtephra Singer (1989)
- Mycena microtrichialis Singer (1989)
- Mycena microxantha Singer (1989)
- Mycena mijoi Grgur. (2003)
- Mycena mimicoseta Desjardin, Boonprat. & Hywel-Jones (2003)
- Mycena miniata Petch (1917)
- Mycena minima Velen. (1947)
- Mycena minirubra G. Stev. & G.M. Taylor (1964)
- Mycena minutalis Robich (2016)
- Mycena minutissima (Murrill) Murrill (1916)
- Mycena minutuliaffinis Singer (1969)
- Mycena minya Grgur. (1997)
- Mycena mira Maas Geest. & de Meijer (1997)
- Mycena mirata (Peck) Sacc. (1887)
- Mycena miriamae G. Stev. (1964)
- Mycena miscanthi T. Bau & Q. Na (2019)
- Mycena miserior Huijsman (1960)
- Mycena mitis Maas Geest. (1992)
- Mycena moconensis Niveiro, Albertó & Desjardin (2012)
- Mycena monticola A.H. Sm. (1939)
- Mycena morris-jonesii G. Stev. (1964)
- Mycena moseri Robich & Carassai (2016)
- Mycena mostnyae Singer (1969)
- Mycena mridula Aravind. & Manim. (2013)
- Mycena muciflua (Höhn.) Singer (1989)
- Mycena mucor (Batsch) Quél. (1875)
- Mycena mucoroides Aronsen (2016)
- Mycena mucronata Velen. (1920)
- Mycena mulawaestris Grgur. (2003)
- Mycena mulika Aravind. & Manim. (2015)
- Mycena multicaudata Singer (1973)
- Mycena multicolorata G. Stev. (1964)
- Mycena multiplicata Har. Takah. (2007)
- Mycena munyozii Singer (1969)
- Mycena murina (Murrill) Murrill (1916)
- Mycena murinacea Métrod (1949)
- Mycena murna Grgur. (2003)
- Mycena muscicola Robich (2008)
- Mycena mustea Har. Takah. (2007)
- Mycena myceliosa (Murrill) Murrill (1916)
- Mycena myrifica Corner (1994)
- Mycena myriophylla Métrod (1949)
- Mycena myxocaulis Pegler (1977)

== N ==
- Mycena nanoclavula Singer (1989)
- Mycena nargan Grgur. (1995)
- Mycena nebula Cortés-Pérez, Desjardin & Rockefeller (2019)
- Mycena neerimensis Grgur. (1998)
- Mycena neglecta Robich (2016)
- Mycena neoavenacea Hongo (1978)
- Mycena neocrispata Kühner & Valla (1972)
- Mycena neosetosa Miersch & M. Wilh. (2017)
- Mycena neotropicalis Singer (1989)
- Mycena neuhoffii Raithelh. (1971)
- Mycena nevillei Robich (2016)
- Mycena nidificata Har. Takah. (2007)
- Mycena nigrescens Maas Geest. & de Meijer (1997)
- Mycena nigroalba Métrod (1960)
- Mycena nigropuncta Métrod (1949)
- Mycena nigrostipitata Miersch (2013)
- Mycena nimna Aravind. & Manim. (2015)
- Mycena niranjana Aravind. & Manim. (2015)
- Mycena nirbala Aravind. & Manim. (2015)
- Mycena nitrata Velen. (1920)
- Mycena nivalis Grgur. (2003)
- Mycena niveipes (Murrill) Murrill (1916)
- Mycena nivicola B.A. Perry & Desjardin (2016)
- Mycena nobilis (Peck) Murrill (1917)
- Mycena nocticaelum A.L.C. Chew & Desjardin (2014)
- Mycena noctilucens Corner (1954)
- Mycena nodosa Maas Geest. & de Meijer (1997)
- Mycena nodosocystis Métrod (1949)
- Mycena notabilis Maas Geest. & de Meijer (1997)
- Mycena nothofagetorum Singer (1969)
- Mycena nothomyrciae Singer (1962)
- Mycena novissima (Speg.) Singer (1969)
- Mycena nubila Maas Geest. & E. Horak (1995)
- Mycena nucicola Huijsman (1958)
- Mycena nucleata X. He & X.D. Fang (1994)
- Mycena nyula Grgur. (1997)

== O ==
- Mycena obcalyx Corner (1994)
- Mycena obducta Maas Geest. & de Meijer (1997)
- Mycena oboensis A.C. Cooper, Desjardin & B.A. Perry (2018)
- Mycena obscura Robich (2016)
- Mycena obscurata Maas Geest. & de Meijer (1998)
- Mycena obscuritatis Corner (1994)
- Mycena obtecta Maas Geest. (1993)
- Mycena obtusiceps Speg. (1921)
- Mycena occidentalis (Murrill) Murrill (1916)
- Mycena occulta Harmaja (1985)
- Mycena ochracea (G. Stev.) E. Horak (1971)
- Mycena ochraceocinerea (Murrill) Murrill (1916)
- Mycena ochraceoviscosa Raithelh. (1972)
- Mycena oculisnymphae Desjardin, B.A. Perry & Stevani (2016)
- Mycena odora Maas Geest. & E. Horak (1995)
- Mycena odorifera (Peck) Sacc. (1887)
- Mycena oligophylla Aronsen & Maas Geest. (1990)
- Mycena olivaceoalcalina Singer (1938)
- Mycena olivaceobrunnea A.H. Sm. (1937)
- Mycena olivaceoflava M. Villarreal, Heykoop & Maas Geest. (1999)
- Mycena olivaceomarginata (Massee) Massee (1893)
- Mycena omnicola Métrod (1949)
- Mycena omniumsanctorum Singer (1969)
- Mycena omphalophora Singer (1977)
- Mycena opaca Velen. (1947)
- Mycena oratiensis Segedin (1991)
- Mycena orchidicola L. Fan & S.X. Guo (1996)
- Mycena oreadeoides Singer (1973)
- Mycena ornatororida Maas Geest. & de Meijer (1997)
- Mycena orophila Romagn. (1994)
- Mycena oss-emeri Robich (2016)
- Mycena overholtsii A.H. Sm. & Solheim (1953)
- Mycena ovispora Rick (1961)

== P ==
- Mycena pachyderma Kühner (1926)
- Mycena paetzoldii Robich (2016)
- Mycena pallescens Maas Geest. & Hauskn. (1995)
- Mycena pallida (Murrill) A.H. Sm. (1947)
- Mycena palmicola Desjardin, Boonprat. & Hywel-Jones (2002)
- Mycena palmivora Singer (1962)
- Mycena paludicola (Murrill) Murrill (1916)
- Mycena paludosa Naveau (1923)
- Mycena pantopolia Singer (1989)
- Mycena papillata (Peck) A.H. Sm. (1947)
- Mycena papilligera Singer (1977)
- Mycena papyracea Desjardin & Hemmes (2001)
- Mycena parabolica (Fr.) Quél. (1872)
- Mycena paraboliciformis Singer (1951)
- Mycena paracapillaripes Robich (2016)
- Mycena paraguariensis (Speg.) Niveiro, Popoff & Albertó (2017)
- Mycena paraguaya Speg. (1922)
- Mycena paranaensis Maas Geest. & de Meijer (1997)
- Mycena parca Aronsen (1994)
- Mycena parmula Corner (1994)
- Mycena parnaja Aravind. & Manim. (2015)
- Mycena parsimonia Corner (1994)
- Mycena parsonsii G. Stev. (1964)
- Mycena parvipapillata Robich (2016)
- Mycena parvistrobilicola Robich (2010)
- Mycena parvoaquosipes Robich (2005)
- Mycena parvocystidiosa Robich (2016)
- Mycena pasvikensis Aronsen (2016)
- Mycena patagonica Singer (1969)
- Mycena patala Aravind. & Manim. (2015)
- Mycena paucilamellata A.H. Sm. (1947)
- Mycena paula Maas Geest. & de Meijer (1997)
- Mycena pearsoniana Dennis ex Singer (1959)
- Mycena pectinata (Murrill) Murrill (1916)
- Mycena pelava Aravind. & Manim. (2014)
- Mycena pelianthina (Fr.) Quél. (1872)
- Mycena pellucida Henn. (1898)
- Mycena perechinulata Corner (1994)
- Mycena perlae Cortés-Pérez, Desjardin & Rockefeller (2019)
- Mycena perpusilla Velen. (1920)
- Mycena peyerimhoffii Maire (1932)
- Mycena phaeonox A.C. Cooper, Desjardin & B.A. Perry (2018)
- Mycena phlogina Maas Geest. & E. Horak (1995)
- Mycena phoenicis-canariensis Robich (2005)
- Mycena phyllogena (Pers.) Singer (1961)
- Mycena phyllophila Velen. (1920)
- Mycena picea Velen. (1947)
- Mycena piceicola A.H. Sm. (1939)
- Mycena picta (Fr.) Harmaja (1979)
- Mycena piguicola Singer (1977)
- Mycena pileopigmentata Robich (2016)
- Mycena pilifera Métrod (1949)
- Mycena piligera Robich (2016)
- Mycena pilosa Métrod (1949)
- Mycena pilosella Maas Geest. (1988)
- Mycena pilosostipitata Miersch & Robich (2016)
- Mycena pinastri Robich (2006)
- Mycena pinetorum J.E. Lange (1914)
- Mycena pingala Aravind. & Manim. (2015)
- Mycena pinicola G. Stev. (1964)
- Mycena pini-rigidae Robich (1999)
- Mycena pinophila M. Villarreal, Arenal & V. Rubio (2002)
- Mycena piricystis Métrod (1949)
- Mycena piringa Grgur. (1997)
- Mycena pirrhuarum Speg. (1898)
- Mycena pistacea Maas Geest. & de Meijer (1997)
- Mycena piterbargii Singer (1969)
- Mycena pitereka Grgur. (1997)
- Mycena plectophylla (Mont.) Dennis (1970)
- Mycena pleurotellula Corner (1994)
- Mycena plicatula Miersch & Rödel (2011)
- Mycena plumbeobrunnea (Murrill) Murrill (1916)
- Mycena plumbiana Bolognini & Robich (2016)
- Mycena plumipes (Kalchbr.) P.-A. Moreau (2003)
- Mycena pluricaudata Robich (2016)
- Mycena pluteoides T. Bau & Q. Na (2021)
- Mycena pluvialis Singer (1989)
- Mycena pocilliformis Corner (1994)
- Mycena podocarpi Segedin (1991)
- Mycena poecila Singer (1989)
- Mycena poincola Velen. (1939)
- Mycena poliocephala Singer (1989)
- Mycena polyadelpha (Lasch) Kühner (1938)
- Mycena polygramma (Bull.) Gray (1821)
- Mycena polygrammoides Speg. (1898)
- Mycena porphyrea Maas Geest. & E. Horak (1995)
- Mycena porphyrocephala Singer (1989)
- Mycena pradensis A. Tacconi, L. Setti & G. Maraia (2020)
- Mycena praelonga (Peck) Sacc. (1887)
- Mycena pratensis Singer (1973)
- Mycena primulina G. Stev. (1964)
- Mycena profusa Manim. & Leelav. (1988)
- Mycena propinqua Maas Geest. & de Meijer (1997)
- Mycena propria Maas Geest. & de Meijer (1997)
- Mycena proxima Maas Geest. & de Meijer (1997)
- Mycena pruinatipes Robich (2005)
- Mycena pruinosoaquosipes Robich (2016)
- Mycena pruni Velen. (1920)
- Mycena pseudoalnicola Singer (1969)
- Mycena pseudoandrosacea (Bull.) Z.S. Bi (1986)
- Mycena pseudoclavicularis A.H. Sm. (1947)
- Mycena pseudocorticola Kühner (1938)
- Mycena pseudocrocata Dennis (1951)
- Mycena pseudocyanorrhiza Robich (2003)
- Mycena pseudoeburnea Robich (2016)
- Mycena pseudofagetorum Robich (2016)
- Mycena pseudoglutinosa Z.S. Bi (1985)
- Mycena pseudogrisea (Murrill) A.H. Sm. (1947)
- Mycena pseudoinclinata A.H. Sm. (1947)
- Mycena pseudolaevigata Kalamees (1986)
- Mycena pseudomaculata Kalamees (1989)
- Mycena pseudo-olida Robich (2016)
- Mycena pseudopelianthina J.E. Lange (1934)
- Mycena pseudopicta (J.E. Lange) Kühner (1938)
- Mycena pseudopullata Herp. (1912)
- Mycena pseudoquerciphila Robich (2016)
- Mycena pseudoseta Desjardin, Boonprat. & Hywel-Jones (2003)
- Mycena pseudospinosa Miersch & M. Wilh. (2017)
- Mycena pseudostylobates Kobayasi (1951)
- Mycena pseudostylotabes Singer (1973)
- Mycena pseudosudora Raithelh. (1995)
- Mycena pseudovitilis Raithelh. (1980)
- Mycena pseudovulgaris Kühner (1938)
- Mycena pteridophila Hadjist. & Grund (1985)
- Mycena pterigena (Fr.) P. Kumm. (1871)
- Mycena ptychocephala Maas Geest. & E. Horak (1995)
- Mycena pulchella Robich (2007)
- Mycena pulcherrima (Peck) Sacc. (1887)
- Mycena pulchra P.L. Leonard (2020)
- Mycena pulchrifolia (Peck) Murrill (1917)
- Mycena pullicaulis Robich (2005)
- Mycena pulvinibasis Desjardin (1995)
- Mycena punctillipes Maas Geest. & E. Horak (1995)
- Mycena punctipes Métrod (1949)
- Mycena punkissima A. Cortés-Pérez, Desjardin & B.A. Perry (2019)
- Mycena pura (Pers.) P. Kumm. (1871)
- Mycena purpureofusca (Peck) Sacc. (1887)
- Mycena pusilla A.H. Sm. (1939)
- Mycena pusillispora Corner (1994)
- Mycena pusillissima (Peck) A.H. Sm. (1947)
- Mycena putroris Corner (1994)

== Q ==
- Mycena quadratipes Métrod (1949)
- Mycena quasishoreinotans Corner (1994)
- Mycena quercifolia Robich (2009)
- Mycena quercilicis Robich (2016)
- Mycena quercina Velen. (1947)
- Mycena quercincola Robich (2011)
- Mycena querciphila Esteve-Rav. & M. Villarreal (1997)
- Mycena querciramuli Robich (2003)
- Mycena quercus-ilicis Kühner (1938)
- Mycena quiniaultensis Kauffman (1935)

== R ==
- Mycena radiata (Dennis) Singer ex Maas Geest. (1985)
- Mycena radicifera J. Favre (1957)
- Mycena radius A.E. Johnson (1877)
- Mycena rainierensis A.H. Sm. (1950)
- Mycena rajatha Aravind. & Manim. (2015)
- Mycena ramicola Raithelh. (1984)
- Mycena ramulicola Métrod (1949)
- Mycena rapiolens J. Favre (1957)
- Mycena rasada Aravind. & Manim. (2013)
- Mycena rebaudengoi Robich (2001)
- Mycena recessa Maas Geest. & de Meijer (1997)
- Mycena refuga Corner (1994)
- Mycena reinae Musumeci & Robich (2014)
- Mycena renati Quél. (1886)
- Mycena repertitia Massee (1899)
- Mycena respersa Raithelh. (1985)
- Mycena rhamnicola Robich (2005)
- Mycena rhaphidocephala Maas Geest. & de Meijer (1998)
- Mycena rhenana Maas Geest. & Winterh. (1985)
- Mycena rhizogena (Pers.) Singer (1973)
- Mycena rhododendri Robich (2003)
- Mycena rhodopus Rick (1930)
- Mycena ribesina Singer (1969)
- Mycena ribesinoides Raithelh. (1974)
- Mycena rigelliae Velen. (1920)
- Mycena rimosacuta Corner (1994)
- Mycena riparia Maas Geest. (1986)
- Mycena robichii Blanco-Dios (2021)
- Mycena robiniae Velen. (1947)
- Mycena robusta (A.H. Sm.) Maas Geest. (1988)
- Mycena rohitha Aravind. & Manim. (2015)
- Mycena romagnesiana Maas Geest. (1991)
- Mycena roriduliformis (Murrill) Dennis (1970)
- Mycena rosaceifolia Singer (1973)
- Mycena rosarum Velen. (1939)
- Mycena rosaviolacea Raithelh. (1980)
- Mycena rosea Gramberg (1912)
- Mycena roseilignicola Corner (1994)
- Mycena rosella (Fr.) P. Kumm. (1871)
- Mycena roseocandida (Peck) Sacc. (1887)
- Mycena roseoflava G. Stev. (1964)
- Mycena roseogrisea Métrod (1949)
- Mycena roseomarginata Hongo (1957)
- Mycena roseoquercina M. Villarreal & Esteve-Rav. (2000)
- Mycena roseotincta Aravind. & Manim. (2015)
- Mycena rosiphylla Velen. (1920)
- Mycena rostellata Velen. (1947)
- Mycena rostrata Velen. (1939)
- Mycena rubescens M. Villarreal, Esteve-Rav., Heykoop & Maas Geest. (1998)
- Mycena rubi Robich (2016)
- Mycena rubidofusca M. Villarreal, Heykoop & Maas Geest. (1999)
- Mycena rubidolimbata Maas Geest. & E. Horak (1995)
- Mycena rubidula Bres. (1903)
- Mycena rubincola Robich (2016)
- Mycena rubrimontana Singer (1969)
- Mycena rubrofarcta Maas Geest. & de Meijer (1997)
- Mycena rubroglobulosa Segedin (1991)
- Mycena rubromarginata (Fr.) P. Kumm. (1871)
- Mycena rubroquercina G. Moreno & Heykoop (2001)
- Mycena rubrotincta A.H. Sm. (1947)
- Mycena rufolimitata Maas Geest. & E. Horak (1995)
- Mycena rugosoides Peck (1903)
- Mycena rustica Corner (1994)

== S ==
- Mycena sabali (Murrill) Murrill (1916)
- Mycena sabulicola Maas Geest. & de Meijer (1997)
- Mycena salicicola Losa España (1945)
- Mycena saloma Aravind. & Manim. (2011)
- Mycena samula Aravind. & Manim. (2015)
- Mycena sancti-luxorii Robich (2016)
- Mycena sandra Aravind. & Manim. (2015)
- Mycena sanguinolenta (Alb. & Schwein.) P. Kumm. (1871)
- Mycena saniosa Maas Geest. & de Meijer (1997)
- Mycena saparna Aravind. & Manim. (2012)
- Mycena saturejophila Vila & F. Caball. (2007)
- Mycena saxegothaeae Singer (1969)
- Mycena schildiana Maas Geest. (1997)
- Mycena scirpicola M. Villarreal, Heykoop, Esteve-Rav. & Maas Geest. (1998)
- Mycena scotina Maas Geest. & de Meijer (1997)
- Mycena secessa Robich (2006)
- Mycena seclusa Maas Geest. & Ovrebo (1997)
- Mycena secretosa Velen. (1947)
- Mycena sejuncta Maas Geest. & de Meijer (1997)
- Mycena seminau A.L.C. Chew & Desjardin (2014)
- Mycena semipilosa Singer (1989)
- Mycena semivestipes (Peck) A.H. Sm. (1947)
- Mycena sepia J.E. Lange (1940)
- Mycena septentrionalis Maas Geest. (1984)
- Mycena sericea Cejp (1930)
- Mycena serotina A.H. Sm. (1947)
- Mycena sertipes Maas Geest. & de Meijer (1997)
- Mycena setigera Métrod (1949)
- Mycena setulipes Métrod (1949)
- Mycena setulosa A.H. Sm. (1947)
- Mycena setulosipes Robich (2004)
- Mycena seynesiella Malençon (1975)
- Mycena seynii Quél. (1877)
- Mycena shoreinotans Corner (1994)
- Mycena sierraleonis Beeli (1938)
- Mycena silvaelucens B.A. Perry & Desjardin (2010)
- Mycena silvae-nigrae Maas Geest. & Schwöbel (1987)
- Mycena silvae-pristinae M.T. Veerkamp & Kuyper (1997)
- Mycena silvana Aravind. & Manim. (2015)
- Mycena simia Kühner (1958)
- Mycena simpsonii Grgur. (2003)
- Mycena sinar A.L.C. Chew & Desjardin (2014)
- Mycena singeri Lodge (1988)
- Mycena sirayuktha Aravind. & Manim. (2015)
- Mycena siskiyouensis A.H. Sm. (1936)
- Mycena smithiana Kühner (1938)
- Mycena snigdha Aravind. & Manim. (2013)
- Mycena sociabilis Métrod (1949)
- Mycena solis A.C. Cooper, Desjardin & B.A. Perry (2018)
- Mycena solitaria Robich (2007)
- Mycena sordiceps Locq. (1955)
- Mycena sordida Velen. (1920)
- Mycena sororia Perr.-Bertr., Boissel. & Lambourd. (1996)
- Mycena sosarum Singer (1959)
- Mycena sotae Singer (1962)
- Mycena sphaerocystis Métrod (1949)
- Mycena sphaerosperma Pegler (1977)
- Mycena sphaerospora Massee (1901)
- Mycena sphagnicola Velen. (1947)
- Mycena spinosa Métrod (1949)
- Mycena spinosae Velen. (1939)
- Mycena spinosissima (Singer) Desjardin (1995)
- Mycena spinulosipes Robich (2004)
- Mycena splendens Maas Geest. & E. Horak (1995)
- Mycena splendida Métrod (1949)
- Mycena squamulosa Singer (1962)
- Mycena sravaka Aravind. & Manim. (2015)
- Mycena steinmannii Raithelh. (1977)
- Mycena stellaris Har. Takah., Taneyama & Hadano (2016)
- Mycena stercoraria Raithelh. (1984)
- Mycena stevensoniae J.A. Cooper (2014)
- Mycena stictopus Maas Geest. & Hauskn. (1999)
- Mycena stipata Maas Geest. & Schwöbel (1987)
- Mycena straminea Beeli (1927)
- Mycena straminella Maas Geest. & de Meijer (1997)
- Mycena strobilicola J. Favre & Kühner (1938)
- Mycena strobilinoidea Peck (1893)
- Mycena stylobates (Pers.) P. Kumm. (1871)
- Mycena suave Robich (2016)
- Mycena suavissima Robich (2016)
- Mycena subacicula Henn. (1899)
- Mycena subalbida Cleland (1931)
- Mycena subalcalina G.F. Atk. (1918)
- Mycena subaquosa A.H. Sm. (1939)
- Mycena subcaerulea Sacc. (1887)
- Mycena subcana A.H. Sm. (1947)
- Mycena subcapillaris Henn. (1899)
- Mycena subceracea A.H. Sm. & Solheim (1953)
- Mycena subconcolor A.H. Sm. (1947)
- Mycena subcorticalis (Cooke & Massee) Sacc. (1891)
- Mycena subcucullata A.H. Sm. (1939)
- Mycena subcyanescens (Henn.) Sacc. & P. Syd. (1902)
- Mycena subcyanocephala W.N. Chou (2019)
- Mycena subdebilis G. Stev. (1964)
- Mycena subepipterygia Murrill (1940)
- Mycena subericola Robich (2016)
- Mycena suberis Robich (2016)
- Mycena subfloccipes (Murrill) Murrill (1946)
- Mycena subfragilis Raithelh. (1974)
- Mycena subfragillima G. Stev. (1964)
- Mycena subfumosa (Murrill) Murrill (1916)
- Mycena subfusca A.H. Sm. (1947)
- Mycena subgalericulata Cleland (1931)
- Mycena subglutinosa Singer (1971)
- Mycena subgracilis vMétrod (1949)
- Mycena subgrisea (Peck) Maas Geest. (1986)
- Mycena subinamyloidea Singer (1943)
- Mycena subincarnata (Peck) Sacc. (1887)
- Mycena subinclinata (Murrill) Murrill (1938)
- Mycena subinsignis Esteve-Rav. & Barrasa (2009)
- Mycena sublongiseta Z.S. Bi (1987)
- Mycena subnigra Cleland (1933)
- Mycena subpalustris (Murrill) Murrill (1945)
- Mycena subpterigena Métrod (1949)
- Mycena subpulverulenta (Murrill) Murrill (1916)
- Mycena subrubridisca (Murrill) Murrill (1945)
- Mycena subrufa Raithelh. (1974)
- Mycena subsaccharifera Speg. (1889)
- Mycena subsanguinolenta A.H. Sm. (1939)
- Mycena subsplendida (Raithelh.) Raithelh. (1991)
- Mycena substannea Henn. (1897)
- Mycena substylobates T. Bau & Q. Na (2019)
- Mycena subsupina A.H. Sm. (1937)
- Mycena subtenerrima Rick (1930)
- Mycena subtenuipes (Murrill) Murrill (1916)
- Mycena subterranea Killerm. (1930)
- Mycena subtilipes Métrod (1949)
- Mycena subtintinnabulum Henn. (1899)
- Mycena subulifera Singer (1969)
- Mycena subumbrina Raithelh. (1972)
- Mycena subvestita A.H. Sm. (1947)
- Mycena subviscida Kauffman & A.H. Sm. (1933)
- Mycena subviscosa G. Stev. (1964)
- Mycena subvitrea A.H. Sm. (1939)
- Mycena subvulgaris Cleland (1927)
- Mycena sudorella Singer (1943)
- Mycena sukshma Aravind. & Manim. (2015)
- Mycena sulcata Velen. (1920)
- Mycena sulphurea Velen. (1920)
- Mycena sulphureoconspersa Rick (1919)
- Mycena surculosa Maas Geest. & de Meijer (1997)
- Mycena susbstatua Corner (1994)
- Mycena swaathiae Aravind. & Manim. (2015)
- Mycena syringescens (Murrill) Murrill (1940)

== T ==
- Mycena taiwanensis Rexer (1994)
- Mycena tallangattensis Grgur. (2003)
- Mycena tapeina Maas Geest. & de Meijer (1997)
- Mycena tasmaniensis Grgur. (2003)
- Mycena tenacipes Kauffman & A.H. Sm. (1933)
- Mycena tenax A.H. Sm. (1936)
- Mycena tenerella Métrod (1949)
- Mycena tenerrima (Berk.) Quél. (1872)
- Mycena tentorium Raithelh. (1988)
- Mycena tenuicaulis Maas Geest. & E. Horak (1995)
- Mycena tenuiceps A.H. Sm. (1947)
- Mycena tenuicorticola Robich (2004)
- Mycena tenuipellucida Robich (2005)
- Mycena tenuipes Robich (2005)
- Mycena tenuisetosa Corner (1994)
- Mycena tenuispinosa J. Favre (1957)
- Mycena tephrina Maas Geest. & E. Horak (1995)
- Mycena tephrophylla Maas Geest. & Schwöbel (1989)
- Mycena terena Aronsen & Maas Geest. (1992)
- Mycena termiticola Corner (1994)
- Mycena termitum Beeli (1932)
- Mycena tessellata (Mont.) Dennis (1970)
- Mycena testacea (Murrill) Murrill (1916)
- Mycena tetrasphaerophora Singer (1962)
- Mycena texensis A.H. Sm. (1937)
- Mycena theobromicola (Murrill) Dennis (1951)
- Mycena tholofegina Robich (2016)
- Mycena thujina A.H. Sm. (1947)
- Mycena thunderboltensis Grgur. (1998)
- Mycena thymiphila Velen. (1947)
- Mycena ticinensis Robich (1996)
- Mycena tinctura Kauffman (1926)
- Mycena tintinnabulum (Paulet) Quél. (1872)
- Mycena toyerlaricola Grgur. (2003)
- Mycena translucentipes (Murrill) Kühner (1938)
- Mycena translucidipes Métrod (1949)
- Mycena tremula Speg. (1898)
- Mycena trichocephala Singer (1973)
- Mycena trichophora Rexer (1994)
- Mycena trinitatis Dennis (1951)
- Mycena triplotricha Singer (1962)
- Mycena tristis Maas Geest. (1988)
- Mycena trojana (Murrill) Murrill (1916)
- Mycena truncimuscicola Robich (2009)
- Mycena truncosalicicola D.A. Reid (1996)
- Mycena tubarioides (Maire) Kühner (1938)
- Mycena turbinata (Murrill) A.H. Sm. (1947)
- Mycena turficola Singer (1969)
- Mycena tuuwuulensis Grgur. (2003)
- Mycena tuvara Grgur. (2003)
- Mycena typhae (Schweers) Kotl. (1953)

== U ==
- Mycena ulmicola A.H. Sm. (1939)
- Mycena umbellula Corner (1994)
- Mycena umbilicata Métrod (1949)
- Mycena umbratilis Maas Geest. & de Meijer (1998)
- Mycena umbrinobrunnea Robich (2016)
- Mycena umbrinovinosa Maas Geest. (1985)
- Mycena umbrinoviolacea Métrod (1949)
- Mycena umeae S. Imai (1941)
- Mycena unicolor Rick (1961)
- Mycena ura Segedin (1991)
- Mycena urania (Fr.) Quél. (1872)
- Mycena ursina Speg. (1921)
- Mycena usambarensis (Eichelb.) Sacc. & Trotter (1912)
- Mycena ustalis Aronsen & Maas Geest. (1989)

== V ==
- Mycena valdiviana Singer (1969)
- Mycena valida Maas Geest. & Münzmay (1997)
- Mycena valkaja Aravind. & Manim. (2015)
- Mycena vamana Aravind. & Manim. (2015)
- Mycena variicystis Boonprat. (2009)
- Mycena vasilievae Singer (1943)
- Mycena veneta G. Stev. (1964)
- Mycena venosula Rick (1961)
- Mycena venus C.C. Chang, C.Y. Chen, W.W. Lin & H.W. Kao (2020)
- Mycena venustula Quél. (1883)
- Mycena verecunda Robich (2016)
- Mycena verna Maas Geest. (1998)
- Mycena vernalis Velen. (1920)
- Mycena veronicae G. Stev. (1964)
- Mycena verrucosocystis Robich (2007)
- Mycena vesicaria Velen. (1947)
- Mycena vesiculosa Maas Geest. & E. Horak (1995)
- Mycena vestita Velen. (1920)
- Mycena vexans Sacc. (1887)
- Mycena vibecina A. Pearson (1951)
- Mycena vicina M. Villarreal, Heykoop & Maas Geest. (1999)
- Mycena villicaulis Maas Geest. (1988)
- Mycena villosa Métrod (1949)
- Mycena villosipes Métrod (1949)
- Mycena vimala Aravind. & Manim. (2015)
- Mycena vinacea Cleland (1931)
- Mycena vinaceipora Segedin (1991)
- Mycena vinosella Speg. (1926)
- Mycena virgata Maas Geest. & E. Horak (1995)
- Mycena viridiflava Rick (1938)
- Mycena viridigrisea (Murrill) Murrill (1916)
- Mycena viridimarginata P. Karst. (1892)
- Mycena viridula Henn. & E. Nyman (1899)
- Mycena viscalba S. Ito & S. Imai (1939)
- Mycena viscata Métrod (1949)
- Mycena viscidipes (Murrill) Murrill (1918)
- Mycena viscidipileus Corner (1994)
- Mycena visciditenax Corner (1994)
- Mycena vitilis (Fr.) Quél. (1872)
- Mycena vitrea (Fr.) Quél. (1872)
- Mycena voluptabilis Herp. (1912)
- Mycena vulgaris (Pers.) P. Kumm. (1871)

== W ==
- Mycena waralya Grgur. (1997)
- Mycena winterhoffii Maas Geest. (1991)
- Mycena wrightii S. Ito & S. Imai (1939)
- Mycena wubabulna Grgur. (2003)

== X ==
- Mycena xanthocephala Singer (1973)
- Mycena xanthocystidium X. He & X.D. Fang (1994)
- Mycena xantholeuca Kühner (1938)
- Mycena xanthopoda (Dennis) Dennis (1973)

== Y ==
- Mycena yalensis Singer (1973)
- Mycena yirukensis Grgur. (1995)
- Mycena yuezhuoi Z.W. Liu, Y.P. Ge & Q. Na (2021)
- Mycena yuulongicola Grgur. (2003)

== Z ==
- Mycena zecchinii Robich (2016)
- Mycena zephirus (Fr.) P. Kumm. (1871)
- Mycena zikhara Aravind. & Manim. (2015)
- Mycena ziragra Aravind. & Manim. (2015)
