= Detritivore =

Animal that feeds on decomposing plant and animal parts as well as faeces

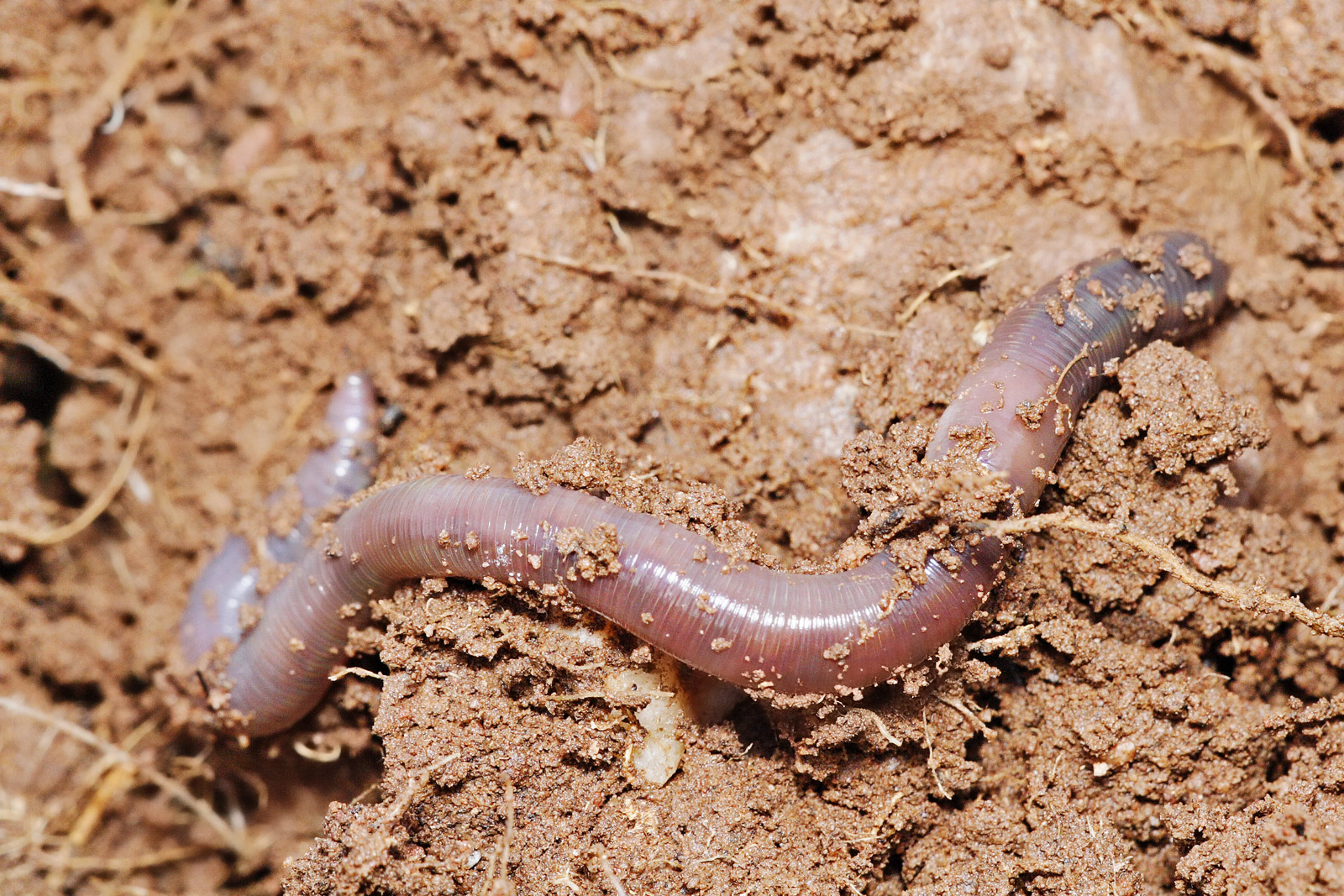
Earthworms are soil-dwelling detritivores.

Detritivores (also known as detrivores, detritophages, detritus feeders or detritus eaters) are heterotrophs that obtain nutrients by consuming detritus (decomposing plant and animal parts as well as feces). There are many kinds of invertebrates, vertebrates, and plants that eat detritus or carry out coprophagy. By doing so, all these detritivores contribute to decomposition and the nutrient cycles. Detritivores should be distinguished from other decomposers, such as many species of bacteria, fungi and protists, which are unable to ingest discrete lumps of matter. Instead, these other decomposers live by absorbing and metabolizing on a molecular scale (saprotrophic nutrition). The terms detritivore and decomposer are often used interchangeably, but they describe different organisms. Detritivores are usually arthropods and help in the process of remineralization. Detritivores perform the first stage of remineralization, by fragmenting the dead plant matter, allowing decomposers to perform the second stage of remineralization.

Plant tissues are made up of resilient molecules (e.g. cellulose, lignin, xylan) that decay at a much lower rate than other organic molecules. The activity of detritivores is the reason why there is not an accumulation of plant litter in nature.

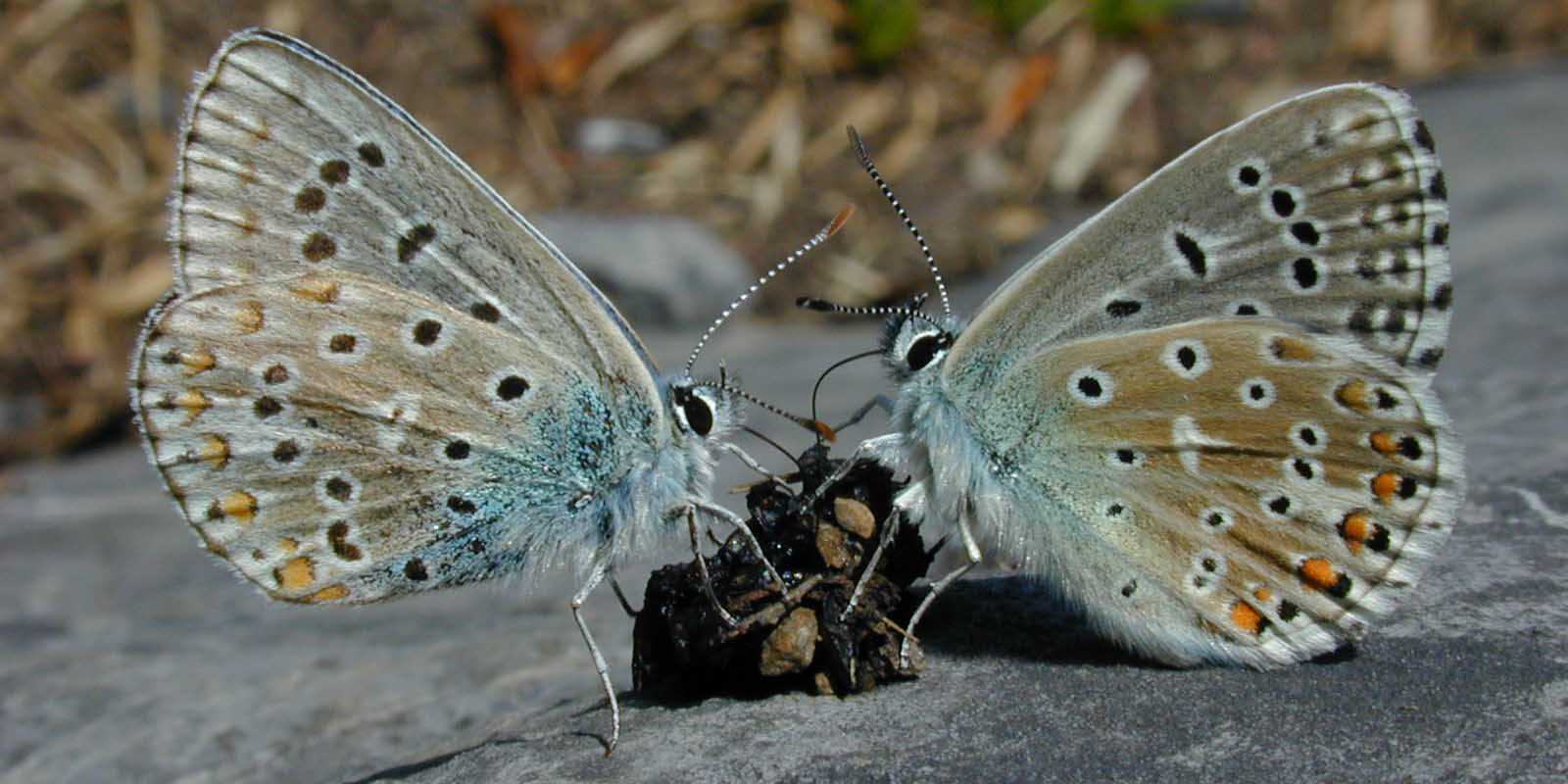
Two Adonis blue butterflies lap at a small lump of feces lying on a rock.

Detritivores are an important aspect of many ecosystems. They can live on any type of soil with an organic component, including marine ecosystems, where they are termed interchangeably with bottom feeders.

Deposit feeding refers to a specific ecology among aquatic detritivores where sediment is ingested in order to extract the particulate organic matter adhered to it.

Typical detritivorous animals include millipedes, springtails, woodlice, dung flies, slugs, many terrestrial worms, sea stars, sea cucumbers, fiddler crabs, and some sedentary marine Polychaetes such as worms of the family Terebellidae.

Detritivores can be classified into more specific groups based on their size and biomes. Macrodetritivores are larger organisms such as millipedes, springtails, and woodlouse, while microdetritivores are smaller organisms such as bacteria.

Scavengers are not typically thought to be detritivores, as they generally eat large quantities of organic matter, but both detritivores and scavengers are the same type of cases of consumer-resource systems. The consumption of wood, whether alive or dead, is known as xylophagy. The activity of animals feeding only on dead wood is called sapro-xylophagy and those animals, sapro-xylophagous.

== Ecology ==
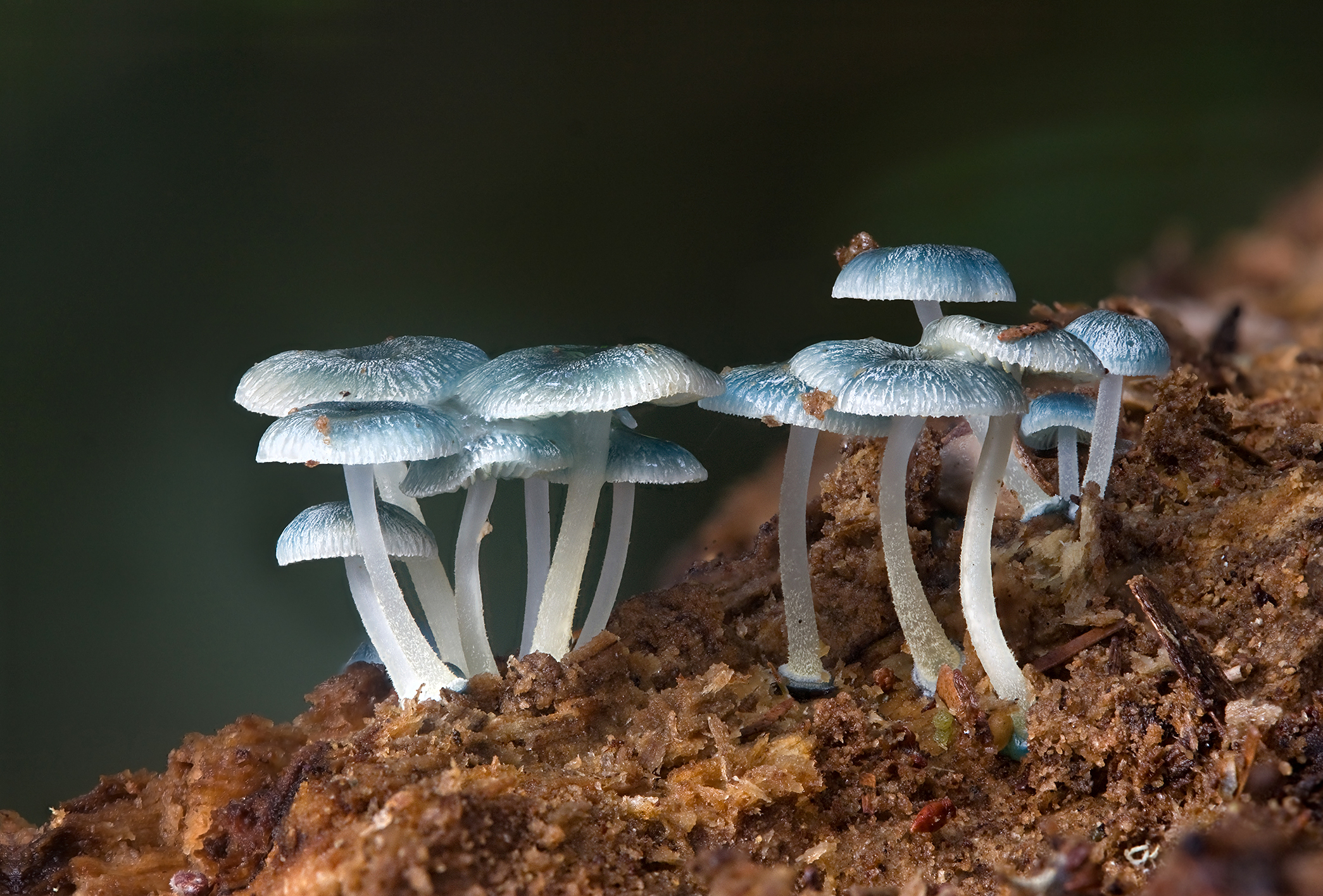
Fungi such as this Mycena interrupta are the secondary decomposers in most environments. Only fungi produce the enzymes necessary to decompose lignin, a chemically complex substance found in wood.

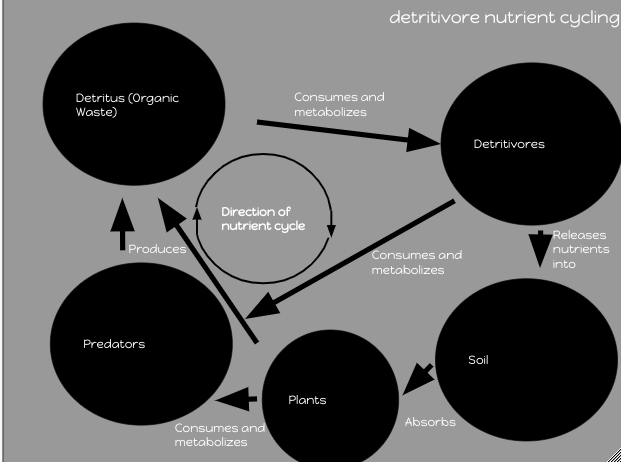
Detritivore nutrient cycling model

Detritivores play an important role as recyclers in the ecosystem's energy flow and biogeochemical cycles. Alongside decomposers, they reintroduce vital elements such as carbon, nitrogen, phosphorus, calcium, and potassium back into the soil, allowing plants to take in these elements and use them for growth. They shred the dead plant matter which releases the trapped nutrients in the plant tissues. An abundance of detritivores in the soil allows the ecosystem to efficiently recycle nutrients.

Many detritivores live in mature woodland, though the term can be applied to certain bottom-feeders in wet environments. These organisms play a crucial role in benthic ecosystems, forming essential food chains and participating in the nitrogen cycle. Detritivores and decomposers that reside in the desert live in burrows underground to avoid the hot surface since underground conditions provide favorable living conditions for them. Detritivores are the main organisms in clearing plant litter and recycling nutrients in the desert. Due to the limited vegetation available in the desert, desert detritivores adapted and evolved ways to feed in the extreme conditions of the desert. Detritivore feeding behaviour is affected by rainfall; moist soil increases detritivore feeding and excretion.

Fungi, acting as decomposers, are important in today's terrestrial environment. During the Carboniferous period, fungi and bacteria had yet to evolve the capacity to digest lignin, and so large deposits of dead plant tissue accumulated during this period, later becoming the fossil fuels.

By feeding on sediments directly to extract the organic component, some detritivores incidentally concentrate toxic pollutants.

== See also ==
- Decomposer
- Saprotrophic nutrition
- Nepenthes ampullaria
- Consumer-resource systems
