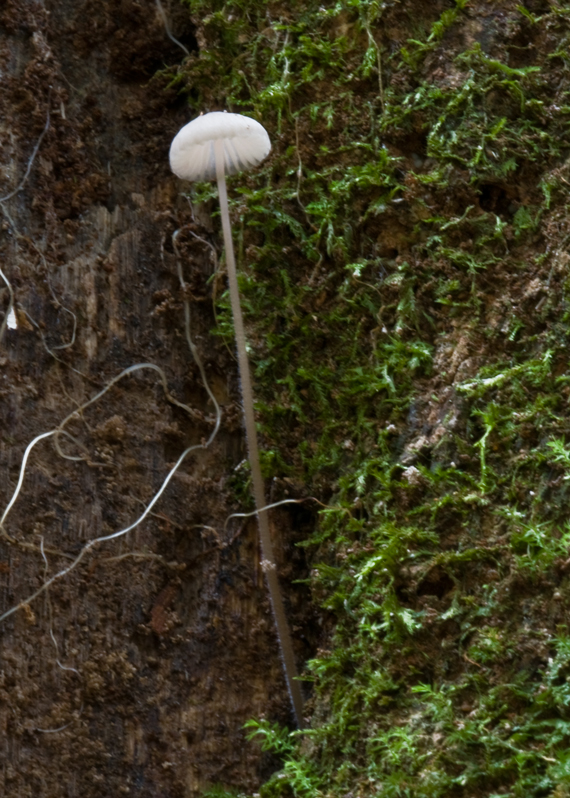
- In New South Wales, Australia

Scientific classification
- Domain: Eukaryota
- Kingdom: Fungi
- Division: Basidiomycota
- Class: Agaricomycetes
- Order: Agaricales
- Family: Mycenaceae
- Genus: Mycena
- Species: M. cystidiosa

Binomial name
- Mycena cystidiosa (G.Stev.) E.Horak (1971)

Synonyms
- Fayodia cystidiosa G.Stev. (1964); Mycena metuloidifera Singer (1969); Mycena hispida Grgur. & A.A.Holland (1982)

= Mycena cystidiosa =

Species of fungus

Mycena cystidiosa Mycological characteristics
- Gills on hymenium
- Cap is conical
- Hymenium is adnate
- Stipe is bare
- Spore print is white
- Ecology is saprotrophic
- Edibility is unknown

Mycena cystidiosa is a species of mushroom in the family Mycenaceae. Described as new to science in 1964, it is known only from New Zealand and Australia. The fruit bodies have a broadly conical small white cap up to 12 mm (0.5 in) wide, with distantly spaced cream-coloured gills on the underside. The stipe is particularly long, up to 20 cm (8 in), with an abundant covering of white hairs at the base. The species is known for its abundant rhizomorphs—long, root-like extensions of mycelia.

== Taxonomy ==
The species was originally described by Greta Stevenson in 1964 as Fayodia cystidiosa. She found the type specimen growing in leaf litter at the Wellington Botanic Garden in June, 1949. It was transferred to the genus Mycena by Egon Horak in a 1971 publication.

The fungus is classified in the section Metuloidiferae of the genus Mycena.

== Description ==
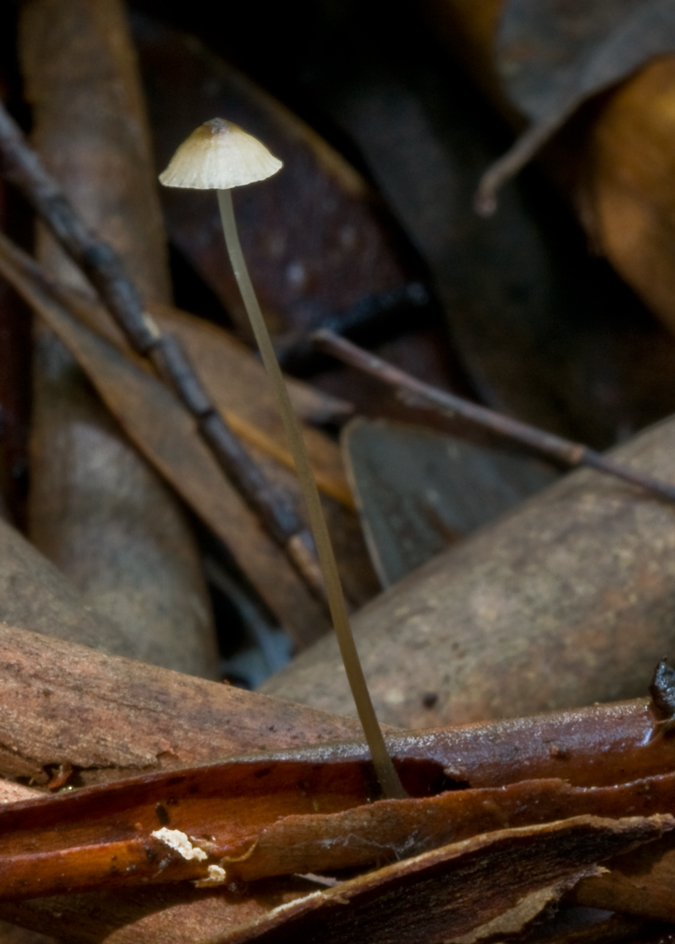
The cap is light brown with a dark brown umbo, and has indistinct radial grooves.

The cap is 6–12 mm (0.24–0.47 in) in diameter, and light brown with dark brown umbo. It is indistinctly grooved and fluted with a somewhat velvety texture; the margin is paler and frilled. The flesh is white beneath the umbo, fawn above the gills. The gills are adnexed, cream-coloured, some with dull pink stains. They are moderately distantly spaced apart, and covered with cystidia. The stipe is 6–8 cm (2.4–3.1 in) long by 1–2 mm (0.04–0.08 in) thick, although Australian specimens have been reported to grow as long as 20 cm (7.9 in). It is cream-coloured above and brown below, with a smooth surface. The stipe is hollow, brittle, and covered densely with white hairs at the base. Extending from the stipe base are numerous lengthy white rhizomorphs that can be up to 30 cm (12 in) long, and terminated by a small cap or knob. The rhizomorphs of are organized as linear strands of mycelia that are differentiated into an inner portion containing large diameter 'vessel' hyphae, and an outer cortex of narrow, thick-walled hyphae. The cap at the end of the strand bears strongly resembles the developing cap of immature fruit bodies.

The spores are 9–10 by 7 μm, amyloid, thick-walled, with an inner wall resembling the mesh of a sieve. Although the spore surface is smooth, it appears rough because of the irregular shape of the inner wall. The type collection also contained half-sized spores, leading Stevenson to suggest that there may be two- and four-spored basidia. Cheilocystidia and pleurocystidia (cystidia on the edge and face, respectively, of the gills) are 25–40 by 8–13 μm, very abundant, thick-walled, and stain weakly amyloid in Melzer's reagent.

== Habitat and distribution ==
Mycena cystidiosa is a saprobic fungus—meaning it obtains nutrients by breaking down decomposing plant organic matter. Although the mushrooms are usually found on fallen leaves, it also grows on wood, utilising the small branch litter common to eucalypt forests. The species may contain the enzymes necessary for decomposing lignocellulosic biomass. It is found in New Zealand, southwestern Australia, and Tasmania. Australian mycologist Bruce Fuhrer calls it "possibly our tallest Mycena". The mushrooms generally fruit from April to June. In a study of post-fire succession in a Eucalyptus regnans forest, researchers found that M. cystidiosa appeared in the third of three phases of recolonization, more than seven years after the burn. Other mycenas often found in this "mature" phase include M. austrofilopes, M. austrororida, and M. interrupta.
