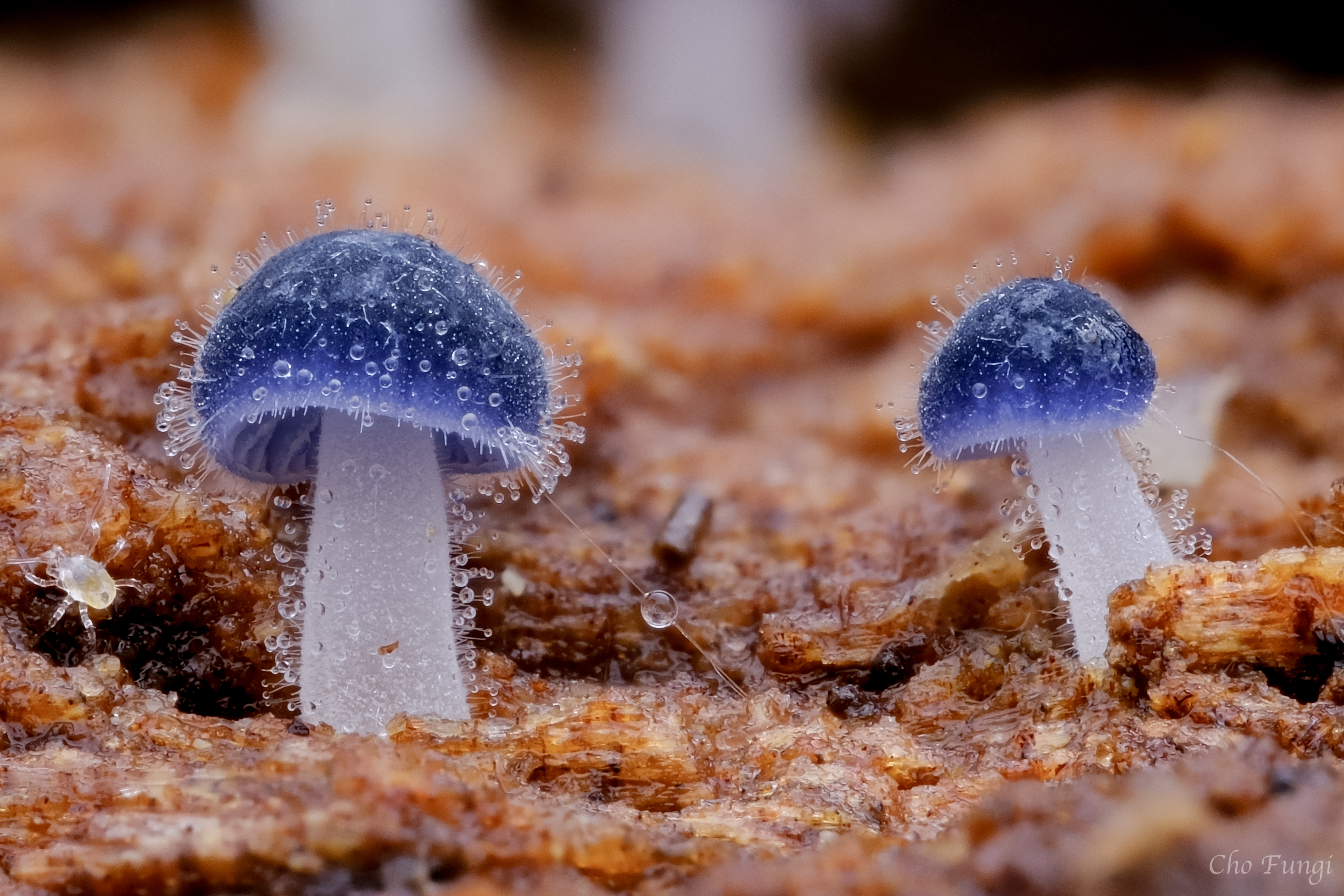

Scientific classification
- Kingdom: Fungi
- Division: Basidiomycota
- Class: Agaricomycetes
- Order: Agaricales
- Family: Mycenaceae
- Genus: Pruinomycena
- Species: P. subcyanocephala

Binomial name
- Pruinomycena subcyanocephala W.N.Chou, 2023

= Pruinomycena subcyanocephala =

Mycena subcyanocephala

Species of mushroom

Pruinomycena subcyanocephala
- Mycological characteristics
- Gills on hymenium
- Cap is convex or depressed
- Hymenium is adnate
- Stipe is bare
- Spore print is white
- Ecology is saprotrophic
- Edibility is unknown

Pruinomycena subcyanocephala is a species of fungi, which has its habitat in the tropical parts of Taiwan. Mycena subcyanocephala is noted for its small size, with buttons about 1 mm tall. The species belongs to the Mycenaceae family, with Mycena interrupta being its closest known relative.

Pruinomycena subcyanocephala should not be regarded as edible. Neither substantial nor psychedelic, it could also embody the toxic chemical muscarine.

Pruinomycena subcyanocephala grows on wood in the tropical parts of Taiwan. It is currently the smallest known mushroom in the world, with caps about 1 mm tall and a white color with a pale blue tone. It has 2-spored basidia, smooth round-headed cheilocystidia, and thin-walled pileiocystidia and caulocystidia. In 2024, Yang et al. reassigned the species to the genus Pruinomycena based on molecular phylogenetic evidence from ITS sequence analysis of the holotype.

== Description ==
Pruinomycena subcyanocephala is a lignicolous species, having tomentulose fruitbodies, a white cap with pale blue tone, a thin-walled pileiocystidia and caulocystidia, smooth round-headed cheilocystidia, inamyloid basidiospores, and 2-spored basidia.
