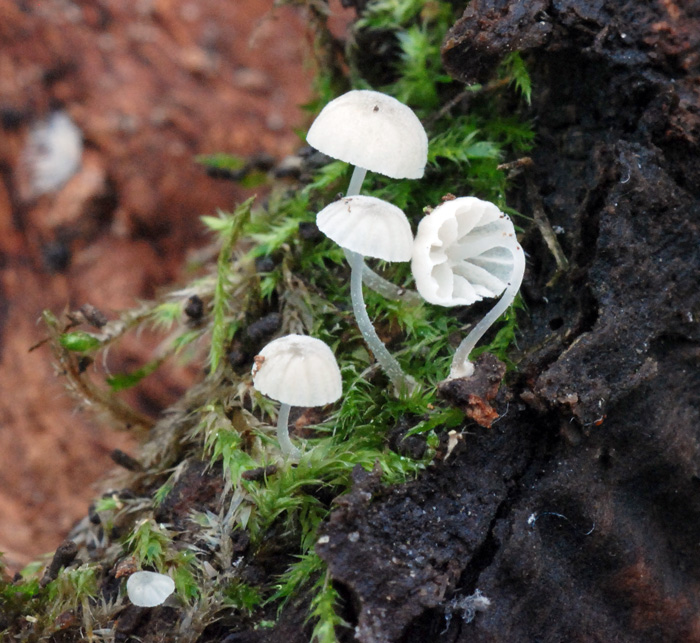

Scientific classification
- Kingdom: Fungi
- Division: Basidiomycota
- Class: Agaricomycetes
- Order: Agaricales
- Family: Mycenaceae
- Genus: Mycena
- Species: M. clavularis

Binomial name
- Mycena clavularis (Batsch) Sacc.

= Mycena clavularis =

Species of fungus

Mycena clavularis is a species of fungus that often grows on (often moss-covered) bark of various deciduous trees, but also on Abies and Picea. It typically grows in autumn to early winter.
