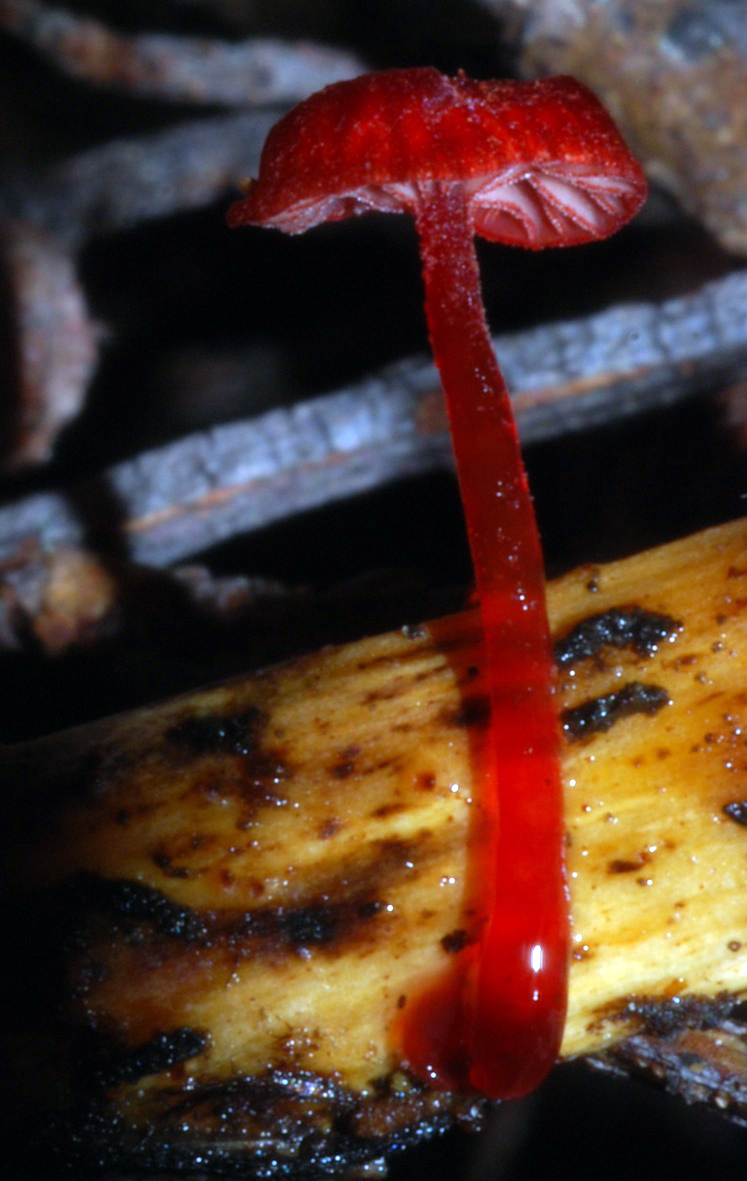
- At Kaipara Harbour, Auckland, New Zealand

Scientific classification
- Domain: Eukaryota
- Kingdom: Fungi
- Division: Basidiomycota
- Class: Agaricomycetes
- Order: Agaricales
- Family: Mycenaceae
- Genus: Mycena
- Species: M. minirubra

Binomial name
- Mycena minirubra G.Stev. & G.M.Taylor (1964)

= Mycena minirubra =

Species of fungus

Mycena minirubra is a species of fungus in the family Mycenaceae. Found only in New Zealand, the fungus produces tiny crimson fruit bodies with caps up to 1 mm (0.04 in) in diameter, atop that stems that arise from a basal disk of mycelium.

== Taxonomy ==
The species was first described scientifically by New Zealand mycologists Greta Stevenson and Grace Marie Taylor in a 1964 publication. The type specimens were found by Taylor in May, 1961, at the Wellington Botanic Garden.

The fungus was originally classified in the section Basipedes, but since that time, Rudolph Arnold Maas Geesteranus has divided Basipedes into five new sections.

== Description ==
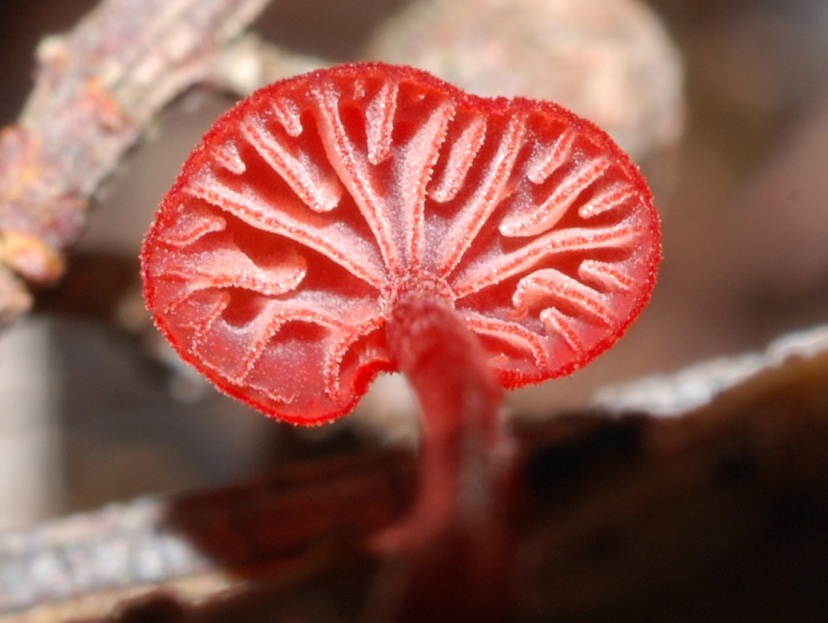
The gills are distantly spaced.

The cap is 0.5–1 mm (0.02–0.04 in) in diameter, crimson, and hemispheric in shape. The cap surface has 10–16 deep grooves that correspond to the position of the gills underneath. The flesh is thin and red. The gills have a decurrent attachment to the stem, and are distantly spaced. They are shallow, apricot in color, and occasionally forked. The edges of the gills are covered with crimson vesicles. The stem is 3–5 mm (0.12–0.20 in) by 0.1–0.5 mm (0.004–0.02 in), crimson, smooth, with a white disc of mycelium at the base.

The spores are tear-shaped, and measure 7–10 by 3–4 μm. They are amyloid, meaning they will absorb iodine when stained with Melzer's reagent. The cheilocystidia are flask-shaped to pin-headed, measuring 40 by 5–8 μm. The red pigment will dissolve in a solution of ammonium hydroxide.

== Habitat and distribution ==
Like all Mycena species, M. minirubra is saprobic—feeding off the decomposing organic remains of plant matter. The mushroom was originally found growing on the fallen leaves of Elaeocarpus dentatus, a species of flowering plant in the family Elaeocarpaceae. It has been reported from the Bullock Creek Track in Punakaiki, and the Nile River Walkway.
