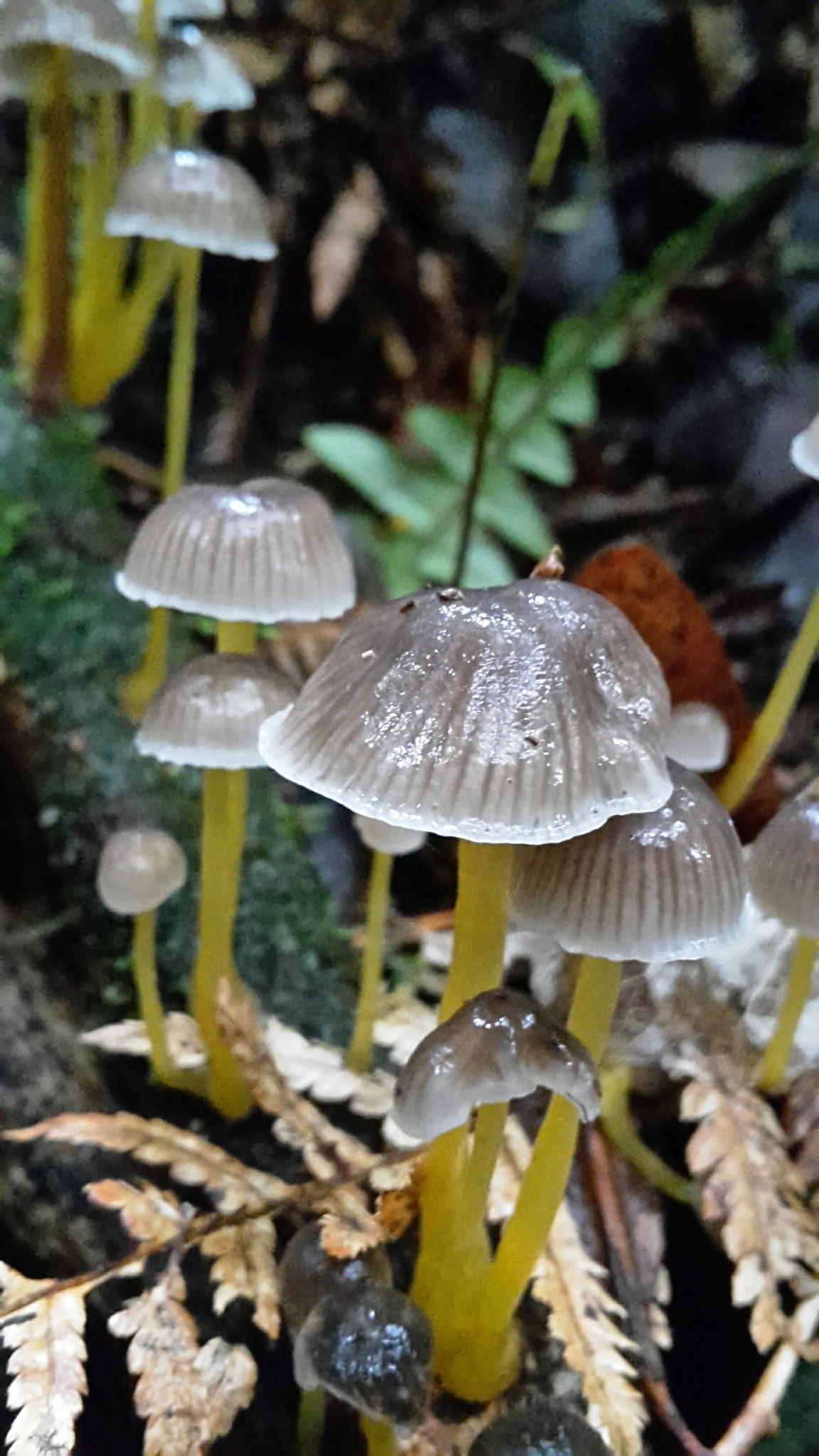
- Mycena subviscosa fruiting bodies

Scientific classification
- Kingdom: Fungi
- Division: Basidiomycota
- Class: Agaricomycetes
- Order: Agaricales
- Family: Mycenaceae
- Genus: Mycena
- Species: M. subviscosa

Binomial name
- Mycena subviscosa G.Stev.

= Mycena subviscosa =

Species of fungi

Mycena subviscosa is a species of fungi in the genus Mycena. It is endemic to New Zealand.

== Taxonomy ==
The species was first described in 1964 by New Zealand botanist and mycologist Greta Stevenson. The holotype specimen was collected on Leith Saddle in Dunedin on 23 March 1953 by Greta Stevenson.

The obligate synonym is Collopus subviscosa comb. nov.

== Description ==
This species has a pileus that ranges from 5–10 mm in diameter, with a striate margin, hemispherical in shape, viscid, drying to subfibrillose and pale greyish fawn colour. The flesh is thin, white and fragile.

Gills are whitish, moderately crowded, and with intercalated long and short gills (short gills interspersed among long), with gelatinised margins. Gill attachment is adnate to strongly decurrent.

The stipe is fragile and hollow, 30–60 mm long and 1–2 mm wide, yellow in colour and very viscid. The stipe is swollen at the base and usually has spreading hyphal hairs. Spores are amyloid meaning they turn blue-back when stained with iodine, which indicates starch presence. The Hymenophoral trama and tissue of the pileus is pseudoamyloid. Cuticle is somewhat gelatinised with narrow, non-amyloid branched hyphal endings.

== Habitat ==
Mycena subviscosa is found in most areas of New Zealand's North Island, besides Gisborne. In the South Island sightings are mainly in the northern regions of the West Coast, and some around Southland and Dunedin. It occurs singly or in groups, on standing or fallen timber.

== Etymology ==
The specific epithet subviscosa derives from the Latin viscōsus meaning viscous or sticky and sub meaning under or below which refers to the sticky texture of the stipe.
