= Mycena lanuginosa =

Scientific classification
- Kingdom: Fungi
- Division: Basidiomycota
- Class: Agaricomycetes
- Order: Agaricales
- Family: Mycenaceae
- Genus: Mycena
- Species: M. lanuginosa

Binomial name
- Mycena lanuginosa Har.Takah. (2007)
- Known only from Kanagawa, Japan

Species of fungus

Mycena lanuginosa Mycological characteristics
- Gills on hymenium
- Cap is conical
- Hymenium is adnate
- Stipe is bare
- Spore print is white
- Ecology is saprotrophic
- Edibility is unknown

Mycena lanuginosa is a species of mushroom in the family Mycenaceae. First collected in 2000 and reported as a new species in 2007, it is known only from lowland oak-dominated forests in central Honshu in Japan. The small mushroom is characterized by its grooved, grayish-brown to violet-brown cap up to 11 mm (0.43 in) in diameter, and the slender grayish-brown to reddish-brown stem covered with minute, fine, soft hairs. The mushroom produces amyloid spores (spores that stain when treated with Melzer's reagent). Microscopic distinguishing features include the smooth, spindle-shaped cheilocystidia and pleurocystidia (cystidia on the gill edge and face, respectively) and the diverticulate elements in the outer layer of the cap and the stem.

== Taxonomy, naming, and classification ==
Mycena lanuginosa was first collected by Haruki Takahashi in 2000, and published as a new species in 2007, along with seven other Japanese Mycena species. The specific epithet is derived from the Latin word lanuginosa, meaning "lanugineous", referring to the hairy stem. The Japanese name for the mushroom is Keashi-haiirotake (ケアシハイイロタケ).

The fungus is classified in the section Fragilipedes (Fr.) Quél., as defined by Dutch Mycena specialist Maas Geesteranus. This section is the largest in the genus Mycena.

== Description ==
The cap is 7 to 11 mm (0.28 to 0.43 in) in diameter, conical to convex to bell-shaped, and has distinct radial grooves that extend almost to the center. It is dry, and somewhat hygrophanous (changing color as it loses or absorbs water). The surface is initially pruinose (covered with what appears to be a fine white powder), but soon becomes smooth. The cap is dark brown at the center, and gradually changes to reddish-brown and finally to nearly white at the margin. The white flesh is up to 0.5 mm thick, and does not have any distinctive taste or odor. The slender stem is 30 to 60 mm (1.2 to 2.4 in) long by 0.8 to 1.3 mm (0.031 to 0.051 in) thick, cylindrical, attached to the center of the cap, hollow, and dry. The top portion of the stem is pruinose, while near the base the surface is covered with soft, fine hairs. The stem color is grayish-brown to reddish-brown near the top, changing to reddish-brown near the bottom. The stem base is covered with long, fairly coarse, whitish fibrils. The gills are narrowly attached to the stem, distantly spaced (12–18 gills reach the stem), up to 1.5 mm broad, thin, and whitish, with the gill edges the same color as the gill faces.

=== Microscopic characteristics ===
The spores are roughly ellipsoid, smooth, thin-walled, colorless, and measure 10–12 by 5.5–6.5 μm. They are amyloid, meaning they will stain blue to black when treated with Melzer's reagent. The basidia (spore-bearing cells) are 35–42 by 7–9 μm, club-shaped, four-spored, and have clamps at their bases. The abundant cheilocystidia (cystidia on the gill edge) are thin-walled, and measure 40–80 by 5–15 μm. The smooth, colorless, and thin-walled spindle-shaped cells sometimes come to an abruptly tapering point; they form a sterile gill edge. Like the cheilocystidia, the pleurocystidia (cystidia on the gill face) are also spindle-shaped, abundant, smooth and thin-walled; they measure 63–102 by 8–15 μm. The hymenophoral tissue (tissue of the hymenium-bearing structure) is made of smooth, thin-walled element hyphae that are 3–25 μm wide, roughly cylindrical (often inflated), hyaline (translucent), and dextrinoid (turning reddish to reddish-brown in Melzer's reagent). The cap cuticle is made of parallel, bent-over hyphae that are 2–6 μm wide, and cylindrical. They can be either smooth, or covered with scattered, warty or finger-like thin-walled brownish diverticulae. The underlying hyphae have a parallel arrangement, and are hyaline or brownish, dextrinoid, with short and inflated cells that are up to 35 μm wide. The stem cuticle is made of parallel, bent-over hyphae measuring 3–6 μm wide. These hyphae, as well as the terminal cells (caulocystidia), have characteristics similar to the hyphae of the cap cuticle. The flesh of the stem is composed of longitudinally arranged, cylindrical hyphae that are 6–20 μm wide, smooth, hyaline, and dextrinoid. Clamp connections are present in the cortical layer of cap and stem, and at the basal septa of the basidia.

=== Similar species ===
Mycena lanuginosa closely resembles M. pilosella, a species originally described from Netherlands by Maas Geesteranus, and the European species M. zephirus; both are in the section Fragilipedes. Mycena pilosella differs in several microscopic characteristics: it has densely diverticulate elements of the cap cuticle; long, cylindrical caulocystidia that diverge at a right angle; and it does not have pleurocystidia. Mycena zephirus is distinct in forming a whitish cap, a stem that is initially minutely hairy but later becomes smooth, radish-like odor, ellipsoid to cylindrical spores, and cheilocystidia with branches near the tip.

== Habitat and distribution ==
Mycena lanuginosa is known only from Kanagawa, in Honshu, Japan. Fruit bodies are found solitary or scattered, on dead leaves and twigs in lowland forests dominated by the oak species Quercus myrsinifolia and Q. serrata. Fruiting occurs from March to November.
