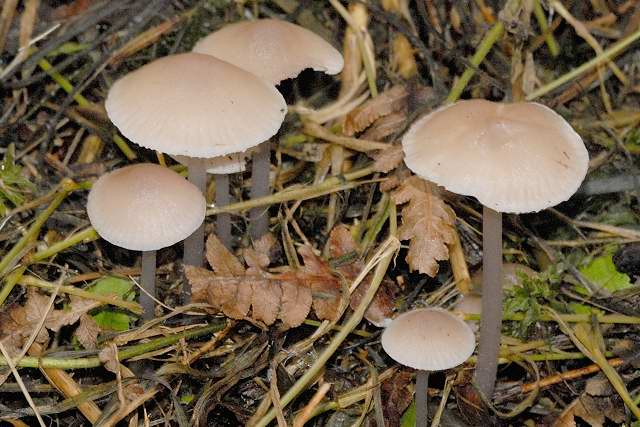

Scientific classification
- Domain: Eukaryota
- Kingdom: Fungi
- Division: Basidiomycota
- Class: Agaricomycetes
- Order: Agaricales
- Family: Mycenaceae
- Genus: Mycena
- Species: M. vitilis

Binomial name
- Mycena vitilis (Fr.) Quél.

Synonyms
- Agaricus vitilis Fr. Mycena filopes sensu auct.

= Mycena vitilis =

Species of fungus

Mycena vitilis Mycological characteristics
- Gills on hymenium
- Cap is conical
- Hymenium is adnate
- Stipe is bare
- Spore print is white
- Ecology is saprotrophic
- Edibility is inedible

Mycena vitilis, commonly known as the snapping bonnet, is a species of inedible mushroom in the family Mycenaceae. It is found in Europe and North America, where it grows on the ground among leaves in damp places, especially under alder. The small pale gray to whitish fruit bodies are usually attached to small sticks buried in the leaves and detritus. They are distinguished by their long, slender stems that root into the ground, and by the grooved cap that reaches diameters of up to 2.2 cm (0.9 in). The grayish-white gills on the underside of the cap are distantly spaced, and adnately attached to the stem. M. vitilis contains strobilurin B, a fungicidal compound with potential use in agriculture.

== Taxonomy and naming ==
First described as Agaricus vitilis by Swedish mycologist Elias Magnus Fries in 1838, it was assigned to Mycena vitilis in 1872 by Lucien Quélet. The white-bodied variant Mycena vitilis var. corsica has been described from Italy, and differs from the main species by its white fruit bodies and differing measurements for several microscopic characters. Carleton Rea named another variety amsegetes (meaning "field by the roadside"), which differs from the type variety by its "obsoletely umbonate" cap, its shorter and thicker stem, and its typical habitat of meadows and roadsides. The name "Mycena filopes" has also been confusingly applied to this species by some authors, although M. filopes (Bull.) P. Kumm. is a species that is recognized as being distinct from M. vitilis.

The specific epithet vitilis is derived from the Latin word for "good for tying or binding with", or "plaited". The mushroom's common name is the "snapping bonnet". In his 1871 Handbook of British Fungi, Mordecai Cubitt Cooke called it the "flexile Mycena".

== Description ==
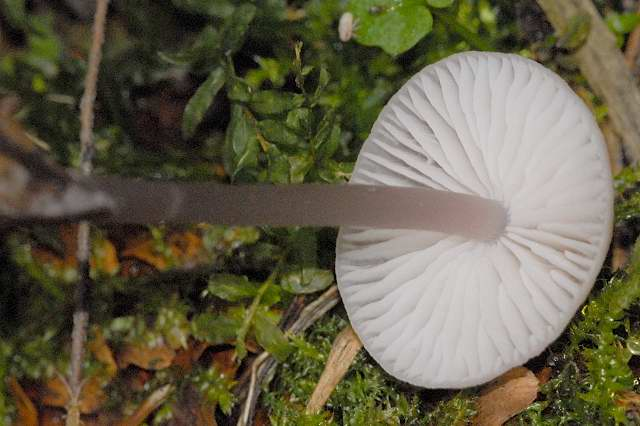
The whitish gills are narrowly adnate.

The cap of M. vitilis is initially conic or bell-shaped, but flattens out in maturity, and typically reaches dimensions of up to 2.2 cm (0.9 in). When young, the cap margin is pressed against the stem, but as the cap expands it becomes bell-shaped or somewhat umbonate, and the margin flattens out or curves inward. The cap surface is initially hoary but soon becomes polished and slimy when moist, or shiny when dry. Even grooves on the cap margin indicate where the gills are located underneath. The cap color is beige (sometimes with a grayish tinge) with paler margins, fading to pale gray or nearly white in age. Occasionally, the mushroom cap has a strong brownish tint when fresh. Moist mushrooms have a slightly sticky surface. The flesh is thin but pliant, grayish or pallid, cartilaginous, and lacks any distinctive odor and taste.

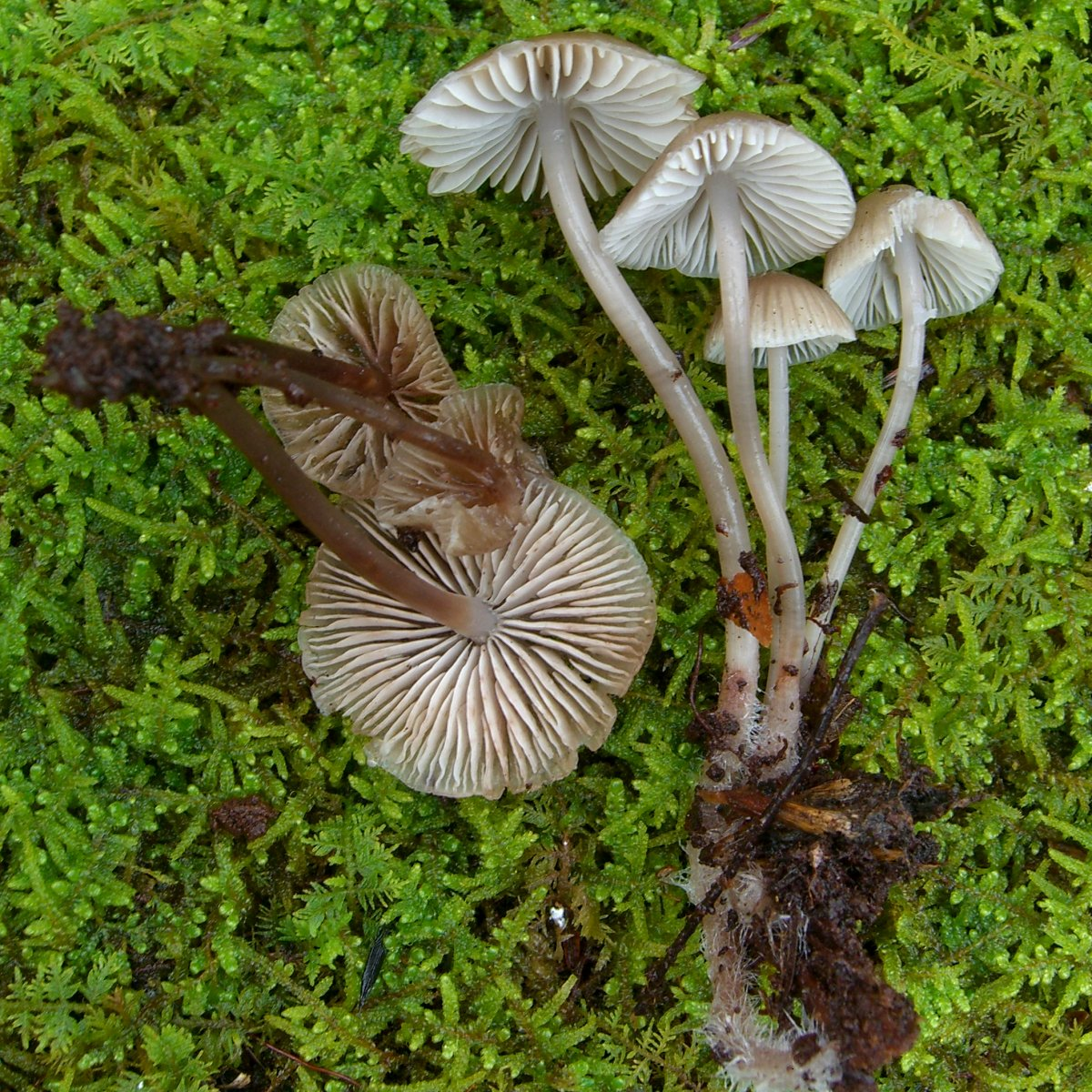
The portion of the stem base rooted in the substrate is covered with white hairs.

The gills are attached by a tooth and are narrowly adnate, close to subdistant, narrow, equal, white or grayish, and with edges concolorous and often slightly eroded. Berkeley noted that the gills "vary a good deal in colour, and are sometimes very dark". The stem is 6–12 cm (2.4–4.7 in) long, 1.5–2 mm (0.06–0.08 in) thick, equal in width throughout, cartilaginous and tough. The stem color is brown with a tinge of pink, and the color lightens towards the top. It is usually straight but often curved toward the base, and roots into in the debris, or is attached to sticks. Smith has noted that in optimal weather conditions, "robust" forms may be found that are "strict and rigid in their appearance." The buried portion of the stem is covered with thick, stiff whitish hairs, and is surrounded with a thin subgelatinous layer, which causes it to be slimy to the touch. Its color is initially bluish-black, soon gray, nearly the same color as the cap, with the apex somewhat fibrous-striate. The mushroom is inedible.

=== Microscopic characteristics ===
The spores are ellipsoid, hyaline, amyloid, and measure 9–11 by 5–6 μm. The basidia (spore-bearing cells) are four-spored. The pleurocystidia (cystidia on the gill face) are not differentiated or are occasionally present near the gill edge and similar to cheilocystidia (cystidia on the gill edge). The cheilocystidia, which measure 32–46 by 8–14 μm, are tapered on either end and can have two to several obtuse fingerlike projections arising from the apex. The gill flesh stains vinaceous-brown in iodine. The subhymenium (the tissue layer directly underneath the hymenium) is made of narrow, interwoven hyphae, with the central portion composed of long, cylindrical, and moderately broad cells. The flesh of the cap has a fairly thick subgelatinous pellicle, a well-differentiated hypoderm, and a filamentous tramal body. All except the pellicle stain vinaceous-brown in iodine.

== Habitat and distribution ==
The fruit bodies of Mycena vitilis are found growing scattered or in groups on debris in hardwood or mixed conifer and hardwood forests. Along the Pacific Coast it is sometimes abundant in Red alder slashes. In eastern North America it is quite commonly found growing in the autumn months of October and November with M. semivestipes and M. pullata. The fungus is widely distributed in Europe (for example, Britain, Germany, Italy, Norway, Poland, Portugal).

== Chemistry ==
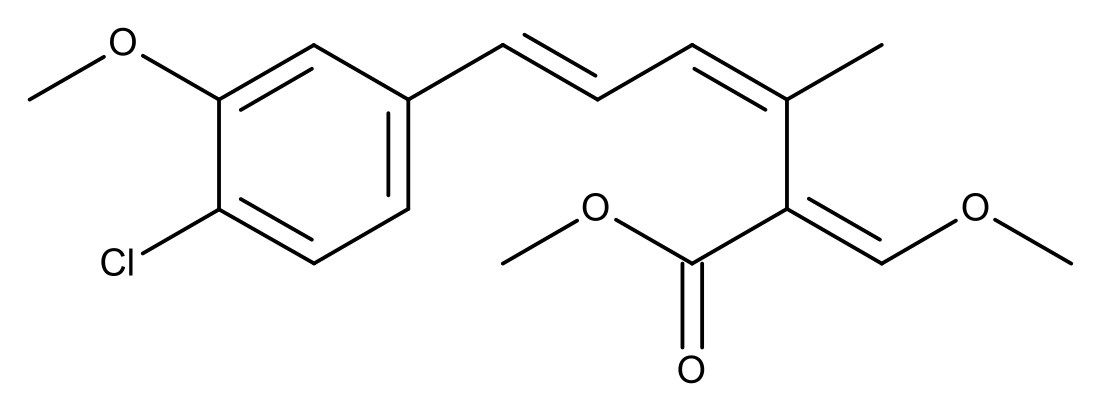
Strobilurin B

The fruit bodies of Mycena vitilis contain the chlorinated compound strobilurin B. Strobilurins are aromatic compounds produced by some fungi that help them secure resources by giving them an advantage against other competing fungi. They have been investigated for potential use as lead compounds for agricultural fungicides.
