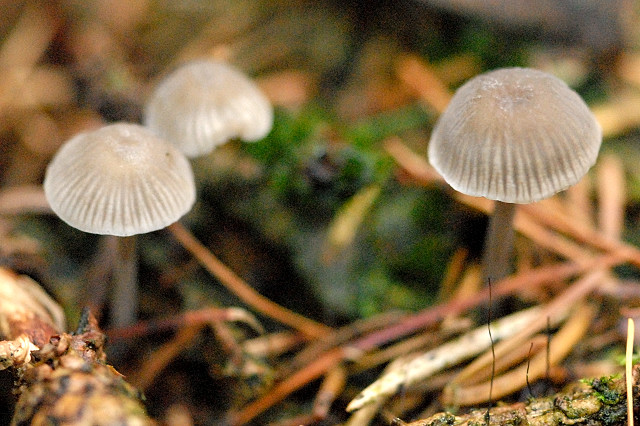

Scientific classification
- Domain: Eukaryota
- Kingdom: Fungi
- Division: Basidiomycota
- Class: Agaricomycetes
- Order: Agaricales
- Family: Mycenaceae
- Genus: Mycena
- Species: M. cinerella

Binomial name
- Mycena cinerella (P.Karst.) P.Karst. (1879)

Synonyms
- Agaricus cinerellus P.Karst. (1879); Omphalia cinerella (P.Karst.) J.E. Lange (1936); Mycena cineroides Hintikka (1963)

= Mycena cinerella =

Species of fungus

Mycena cinerella Mycological characteristics
- Gills on hymenium
- Cap is conical
- Hymenium is adnate
- Stipe is bare
- Spore print is white
- Ecology is saprotrophic
- Edibility is inedible

Mycena cinerella, commonly known as the mealy bonnet, is an inedible species of mushroom in the family Mycenaceae. It is found in Europe and the United States, where it grows in groups on fallen leaves and needles under pine and Douglas fir. The small grayish mushrooms have caps that are up to 1.5 cm (0.6 in) wide atop stipes that are 5 cm (2.0 in) long and 2.5 mm (0.10 in) thick. Its gills are grayish-white and adnate, with a "tooth" that runs slightly down the stipe. The fungus has both two- and four-spored basidia. As its common name suggests, it smells mealy.

== Taxonomy ==
First called Agaricus cinerellus by Finnish mycologist Petter Karsten in 1879, he transferred it to the genus Mycena that same year. In his 1936 Flora Agaricina Danica (Agaric flora of Denmark) Jakob Emanuel Lange referred it to the genus Omphalia; Omphalia cinerea (P. Karst.) J.E. Lange is now a synonym. Mycena cineroides was named and described as a new species distinct from M. cinerella by Hintikka in 1963, who thought it to be unique due to its narrowly acute cap that lacked brownish or yellowish tones, decurrent gills, and two-spored basidia. However, intermediate forms of it have been found, and some authorities, like Dutch Mycena specialist Maas Geesteranus, believe it should be treated as a synonym of M. cinerella.

The mushroom is commonly known as the "mealy bonnet". The specific epithet cinerella means "somewhat ashy color".

== Description ==
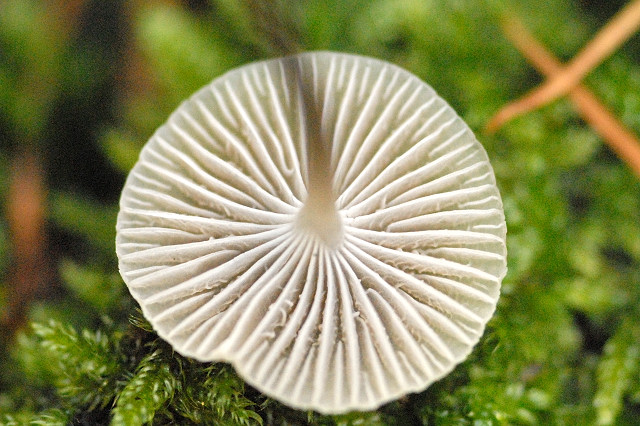
There are 2–3 tiers of lamellulae interspersed between the gills.

The cap of M. cinerella is white and small, with a diameter typically ranging from 0.5 to 1.5 cm (0.2 to 0.6 in). Initially hemispherical, obtusely conic, and then convex, it expands during maturity, developing visible grooves on the surface that correspond to the gills underneath the cap. The cap has a broad, flattened umbo. The cap surface is smooth and moist, with a slimy margin that is initially pressed against the stipe; with age the margin becomes notched and sometimes scalloped, turning translucent. The cap color is dark gray to pale gray, somewhat hygrophanous, fading to ashy white or brown when dry. The flesh is thin, gray, cartilaginous and tough, with a strongly farinaceous (mealy, similar to raw potatoes) odor and taste if crushed or chewed. The whitish to grayish gills are moderately broad (2–3 mm) with a spacing that is close to subdistant, and 18–26 reach the stipe, interspersed with two or three tiers of lamellae (short gills that do not extend fully from the cap margin to the stipe). The stipe attachment is adnate or arcuate, but later develops a pronounced decurrent tooth. The decurrent tooth occasionally separates from the stipe, forming a collar around it. The stipe is 2–5 cm (0.8–2.0 in) long, 1–2.5 mm (0.04–0.10 in) thick, equal in width throughout, hollow, cartilaginous, and brittle. The stipe surface is smooth or polished, with the apex initially faintly pruinose (as if covered with a fine whitish powder). The base of the stipe is sparsely covered with sharp, straight, stiff hairs, and is the same color as the cap or paler. The mushroom is inedible.

=== Microscopic characteristics ===
The spores are 7–9 by 4–5 μm, ellipsoid, smooth, and amyloid (reaction very weak in some collections). The basidia (spore-bearing cells) are four-spored, or occasionally a combination of two- and four-spored. The four-spored forms have clamp connections that are absent in the two-spored forms. The pleurocystidia (cystidia found on the face of the gills) are not differentiated. The cheilocystidia (cystidia found on the edges of the gills) are embedded in the hymenium and inconspicuous, measuring 22–36 by 5–11 μm. They are roughly filiform (like thin filaments), with numerous contorted branches or protuberances, and club-shaped with finger-like prolongations. The flesh of the gills is homogeneous, and turns vinaceous-brown when stained in iodine. The flesh of the cap has a well-differentiated pellicle, with a differentiated but not very well-developed hypoderm, and hyphae that are 10–20 μm wide.

== Habitat and distribution ==
Mycena cinerella is a saprobic fungus, that derives nutrients by decomposing leaf litter and similar detritus, converting it to humus and mineralizing organic matter in the soil. The fruit bodies grow in groups on needles under pine and Douglas fir, typically in the late summer and autumn. In the United States, it has been collected from Michigan, Washington, Oregon, and California. In Europe, it has also been collected from Great Britain, Norway, Poland, and Sweden.
