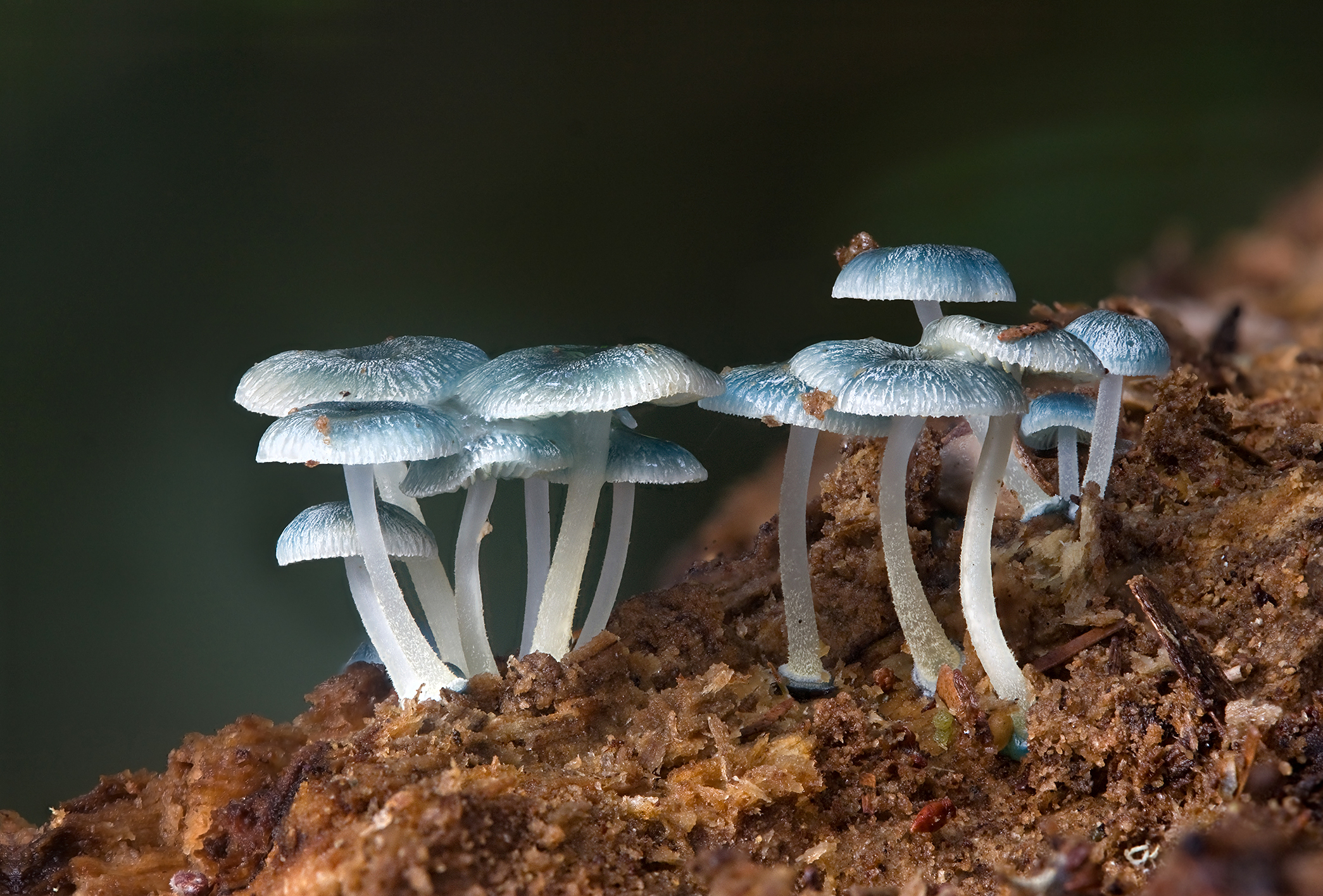

Scientific classification
- Kingdom: Fungi
- Division: Basidiomycota
- Class: Agaricomycetes
- Order: Agaricales
- Family: Mycenaceae
- Genus: Mycena
- Species: M. interrupta

Binomial name
- Mycena interrupta (Berk.) Sacc. (1887)

Synonyms
- Agaricus interruptus Berk. (1860)

= Mycena interrupta =

Species of fungus

Mycena interrupta
- Mycological characteristics
- Gills on hymenium
- Cap is convex or depressed
- Hymenium is adnate
- Stipe is bare
- Spore print is white
- Ecology is saprotrophic
- Edibility is unknown

Mycena interrupta (commonly known as the pixie's parasol) is a species of mushroom. It has a Gondwanan distribution pattern, being found in Australia, New Zealand, New Caledonia and Chile. In Australia, it is found in Victoria, Tasmania, New South Wales, South Australia, and Queensland, where its distribution is limited to Lamington National Park.

== Description ==
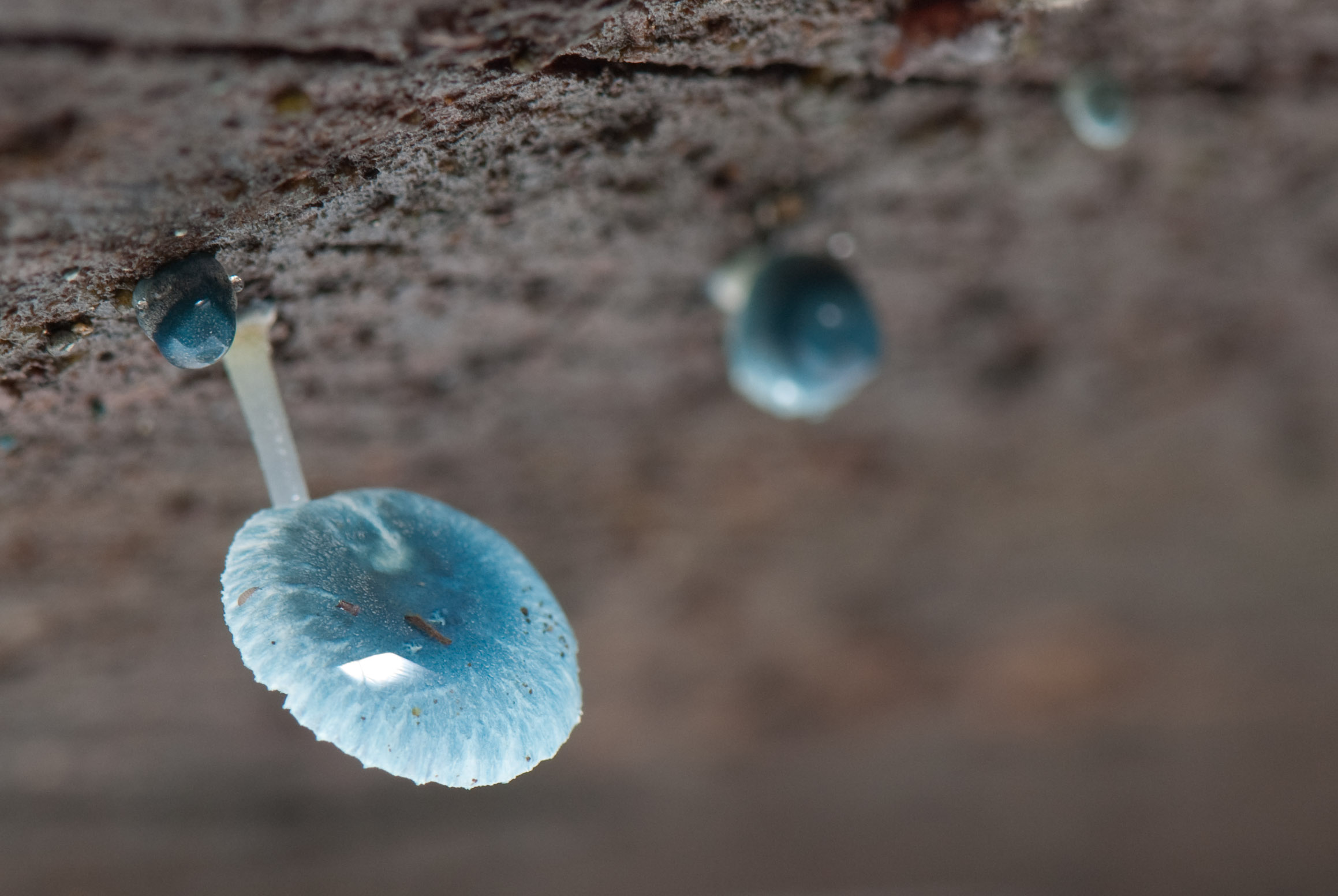
Mycena interrupta growing on a log in East Gippsland.

The caps of Mycena interrupta range from 0.8 to 2 cm, and are a brilliant cyan blue colour. They are globose when emergent and then develop a broad convex shape as they mature, with the centre of the cap slightly depressed. The caps are often sticky and appear slimy looking, particularly in moist weather.

The stipe typically ranges from 1 to 2 cm long and 0.1 to 0.2 cm thick. It is white and smooth, and the base of the stipe is attached to the wood substrate by a flat white disk, similar to Roridomyces austrororidus which, unlike M. interrupta, is attached to the wood substrate by a mass of clumped fine hairs.

The gills are white and adnexed, with blue margins. The spores are white, smooth and ellipsoid, and have dimensions of 7–10×4–6 μm.

Unlike some other Mycena species, Mycena interrupta is not bioluminescent.

== Habitat and distribution ==
The pixie's parasol appears in small colonies on rotting, moist wood in rainforests, and in southern beech or eucalypt forests. It has a Gondwanan distribution.

== In popular culture ==
- The fictional species central to the plot of the adult animated television series Common Side Effects is visually based on Mycena interrupta.
