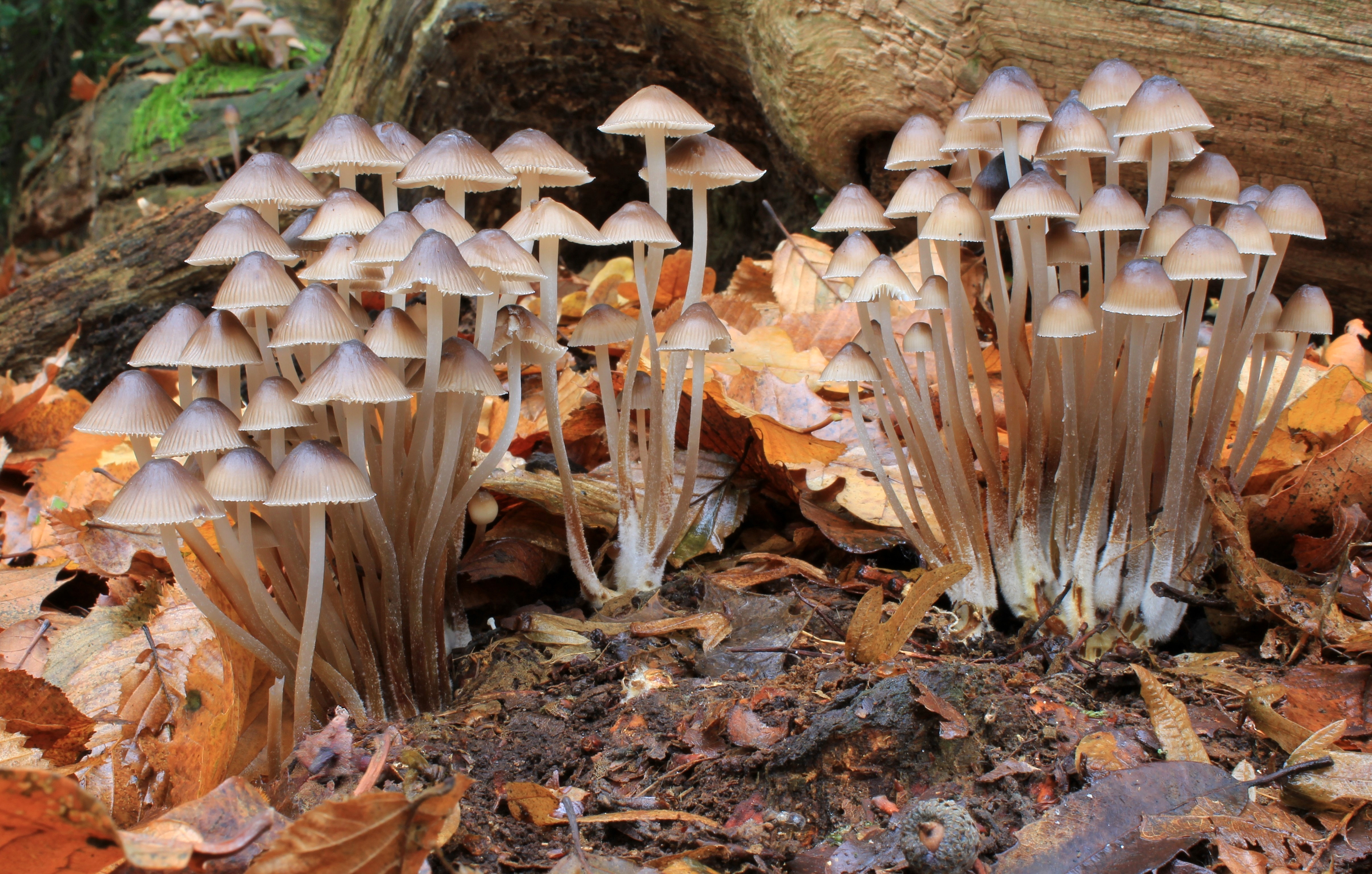

Scientific classification
- Domain: Eukaryota
- Kingdom: Fungi
- Division: Basidiomycota
- Class: Agaricomycetes
- Order: Agaricales
- Family: Mycenaceae
- Genus: Mycena
- Species: M. inclinata

Binomial name
- Mycena inclinata (Fr.) Quél. (1872)

Synonyms
- Agaricus inclinatus Fr. (1838); Agaricus galericulatus var. calopus Fr. (1873); Mycena galericulata var. calopus (Fr.) P.Karst. (1879)

= Mycena inclinata =

Species of fungus

Mycena inclinata Mycological characteristics
- Gills on hymenium
- Cap is conical
- Hymenium is adnate
- Stipe is bare
- Spore print is white
- Ecology is saprotrophic
- Edibility is unknown

Mycena inclinata, commonly known as the clustered bonnet or the oak-stump bonnet cap, is a species of mushroom in the family Mycenaceae. The doubtfully edible mushroom has a reddish-brown bell-shaped cap up to 4.5 cm (1.8 in) in diameter. The thin stem is up to 9 cm (3.5 in) tall, whitish to yellow-brown at the top but progressively becoming reddish-brown towards the base in maturity, where they are covered by a yellowish mycelium that can be up to a third of the length of the stem. The gills are pale brown to pinkish, and the spore print is white. It is a widespread saprobic fungus, and has been found in Europe, North Africa, Asia, Australasia, and North America, where it grows in small groups or tufts on fallen logs and stumps, especially of oak. British mycologist E.J.H. Corner has described two varieties of the mushroom from Borneo. Lookalike species with which M. inclinata may be confused include M. galericulata and M. maculata.

== Taxonomy, phylogeny, and naming ==
First described as Agaricus inclinatus by Swedish mycologist Elias Magnus Fries in 1838, it was assigned its current name in 1872 by Lucien Quélet. Mycena galericulata var. calopus (named by Karsten in 1879), and its basionym Agaricus galericulatus var. calopus (named by Fries in 1873), are synonyms.

In a molecular study of the large subunit ribosomal DNA sequences of mycorrhizal fungi of the orchid Gastrodia confusa, M. inclinata was found to be closely related to M. aurantiomarginata, M. crocata, and M. leaiana.

The specific epithet inclinata means "bent in". The mushroom is commonly known as the "clustered bonnet" or the "oak-stump bonnet cap".

== Description ==
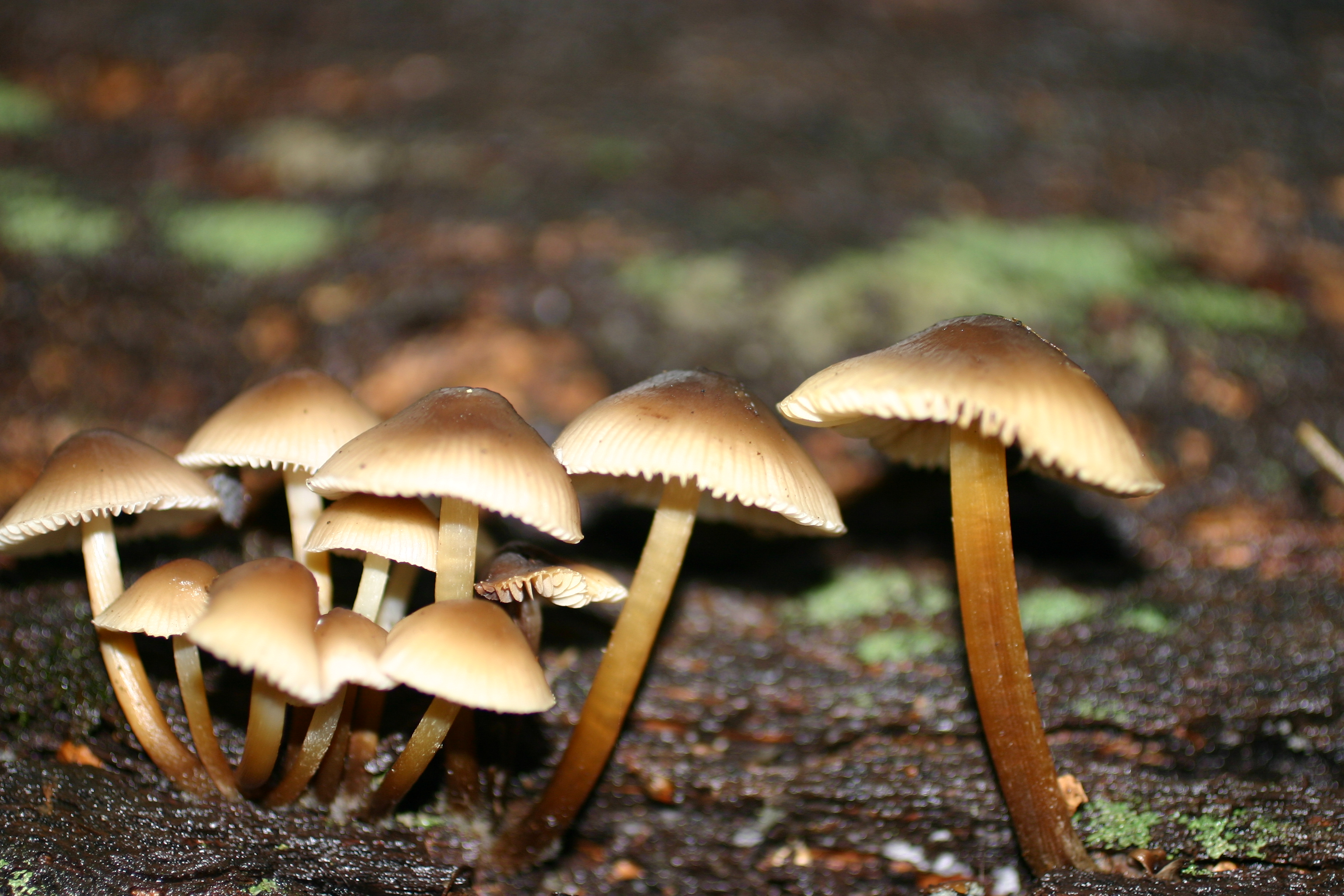
The stems gradually become deep brown near the base.

The cap is light reddish-brown, with a diameter typically ranging from 1 to 4.5 cm (0.4 to 1.8 in). Initially conic to bell-shaped to convex, it flattens during maturity, developing visible surface grooves corresponding to the gills underneath the cap. The margin of the cap has minute but distinct scallops. The surface is moist and smooth, and hygrophanous. The cap frequently develops splits in the margin, or cracks in the disc (the central part of the cap). The flesh of the cap is thick in the center but thin elsewhere, grayish to whitish, fragile, and with a slightly mealy odor and taste. The gills have a decurrent attachment to the stem (that is, running down the length of the stem) and are a pale brownish color with tinges of red. They are broad (between 3 and 6 mm), and have a close to subdistant spacing, with about 26–35 gills reaching the stem. The fragile stem is 3 to 9 cm (1.2 to 3.5 in) long by 0.15 to 0.4 cm (0.06 to 0.16 in) thick and yellow to yellow-brown, becoming reddish-brown to orange-brown in the bottom half in maturity. The lower portion of young stems is covered with white flecks. Roughly equal in thickness at the top and bottom, the base of the stem is covered by a yellowish mycelium that can be up to a third of the length of the stem. The edibility of the mushroom is "doubtful" and consumption "best avoided", although it is considered nonpoisonous.

=== Microscopic characteristics ===
The spores are 7–9 by 5–6.5 μm, broadly ellipsoid, smooth, and strongly amyloid (it turns black when treated with Melzer's reagent). The basidia (spore-bearing cells) are four-spored. The pleurocystidia (cystidia on the gill face) are not differentiated. The cheilocystidia (cystidia on the gill edge) are embedded in the gill edge and very inconspicuous, club-shaped, 26–36 by 5–10 μm, and have tips that are covered with contorted projections that can be slender or thick. The flesh of the gills is homogeneous, and pale yellowish to dirty brown when stained in iodine. The flesh of the cap has a distinct pellicle, a well-differentiated hypoderm (a region of tissue immediately under the pellicle), and a filamentous tramal body (gill tissue); it is pale yellowish to sordid brownish in iodine stain.

=== Varieties ===
E.J.H. Corner defined the varieties M. inclinata var. kinabaluensis and var. subglobospora in his 1994 publication on Agaric mushrooms of Malesia, a biogeographical region straddling the boundary of the Indomalayan and Australasian realms. The variety kinabaluensis (named after its type locality, Kinabalu) has a cap margin that is not scalloped, little or no odor, and cheilocystidia with shorter processes. It was found growing on the dead wood of Lithocarpus havilandii, a stone oak tree in the beech family. Variety subglobospora, found in Sabah, has spores that are almost spherical.

=== Similar species ===
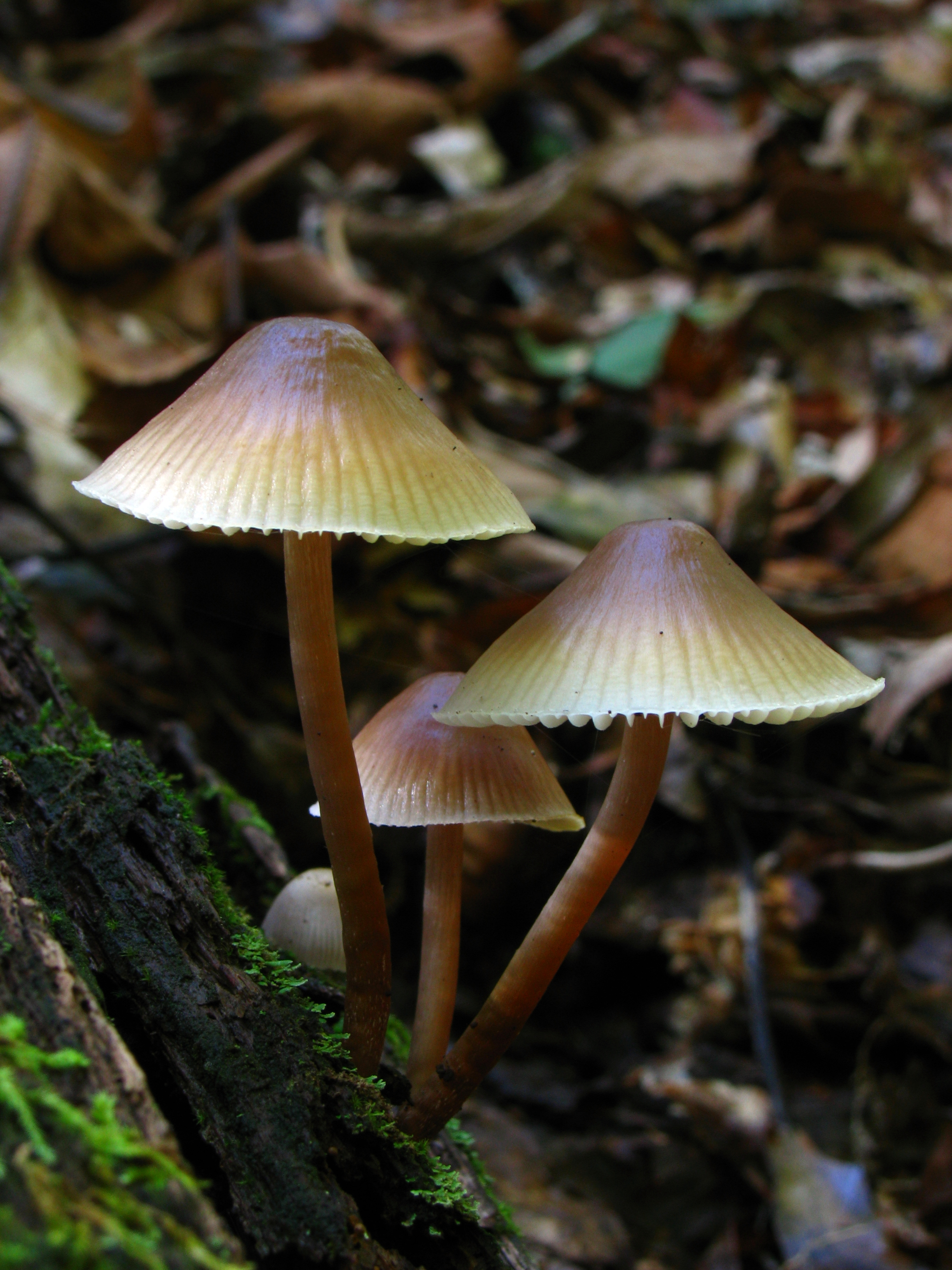
M. galericulata is a lookalike species.

Mycena maculata bears some resemblance to M. inclinata, but is only associated with decaying hardwood logs and stumps, and is found in eastern North America, and sometimes on oak on the West Coast. In age, it develops reddish spots on the gills that are not seen in M. inclinata. M. inclinata is often confused with the edible M. galericulata, a common species that is variable in cap color, size and shape. M. galericulata typically has a bluntly conical cap that is dull gray-brown, and white to grayish veins that have numerous cross-veins. M. polygramma has a ridged stem that is bluish-gray.

== Habitat and distribution ==
Mycena inclinata is a saprobic fungus, deriving its nutrients from decomposing organic matter found in plant litter such as leaves, twigs, bark and branches. It accomplishes this by producing enzymes capable of breaking down the three major biochemical components of plant cell walls found in litter: cellulose, hemicellulose and lignin.

The fruit bodies of Mycena inclinata grow in dense groups or clusters on decaying hardwood logs and stumps (especially oak and chestnut) during the spring and autumn. The fungus forms a white, woolly mycelium on the surface of decomposing oak leaves. Occasionally, it can be found growing on a living tree. In eastern North America, it is abundant in the area bounded by Nova Scotia, Ontario, Manitoba, Missouri, North Carolina, and New York. It has been found in Oregon, but the species appears to be generally rare along the Pacific Coast. The range of the fungus also includes Europe, the Canary Islands, North Africa, East Siberia, Japan, Malesia, Turkey, and New Zealand.

== Chemistry ==
In a study of the trace metal concentrations of various mushrooms species found in Ordu (Turkey), M. inclinata was found to have comparatively high levels of iron (628 mg per kg) and nickel (21.6 mg/kg), measured on a dry weight basis. Laboratory studies have shown that the fungus is resistant to aluminum. The fungus has been investigated for its ability to decolorize synthetic dyes that are used in the textile, plastics, biomedical and foodstuff industries. The dyes are not readily biodegradable, and when discharged into the environment are persistent and many are toxic.

== See also ==
- List of bioluminescent fungi
