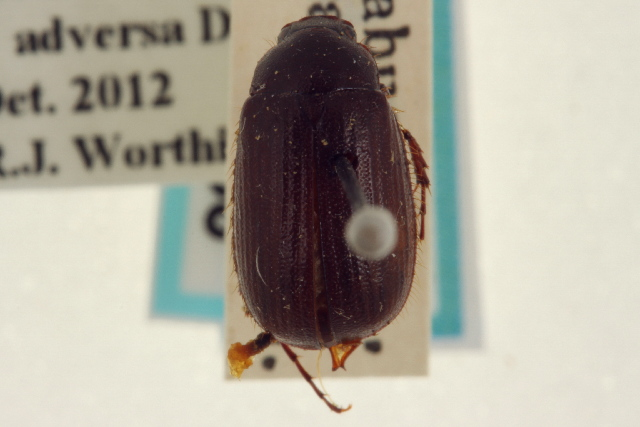

Scientific classification
- Kingdom: Animalia
- Phylum: Arthropoda
- Class: Insecta
- Order: Coleoptera
- Suborder: Polyphaga
- Infraorder: Scarabaeiformia
- Family: Scarabaeidae
- Genus: Serica
- Species: S. adversa

Binomial name
- Serica adversa Dawson, 1967

= Serica adversa =

Species of beetle

Serica adversa is a species of beetle of the family Scarabaeidae. It is found in the United States (California).

== Description ==
Adults reach a length of about 8 mm. They are dark brown, bare and shining with conspicuous, fine, dense punctuation, with a little fine hair on the elytral margin, the basal portion of the legs and the under surface.

== Life history ==
Recorded host plants for the adults are Comarostaphylis diversifolia, Adenostoma fasciculatum and Helianthemum scoparium.
