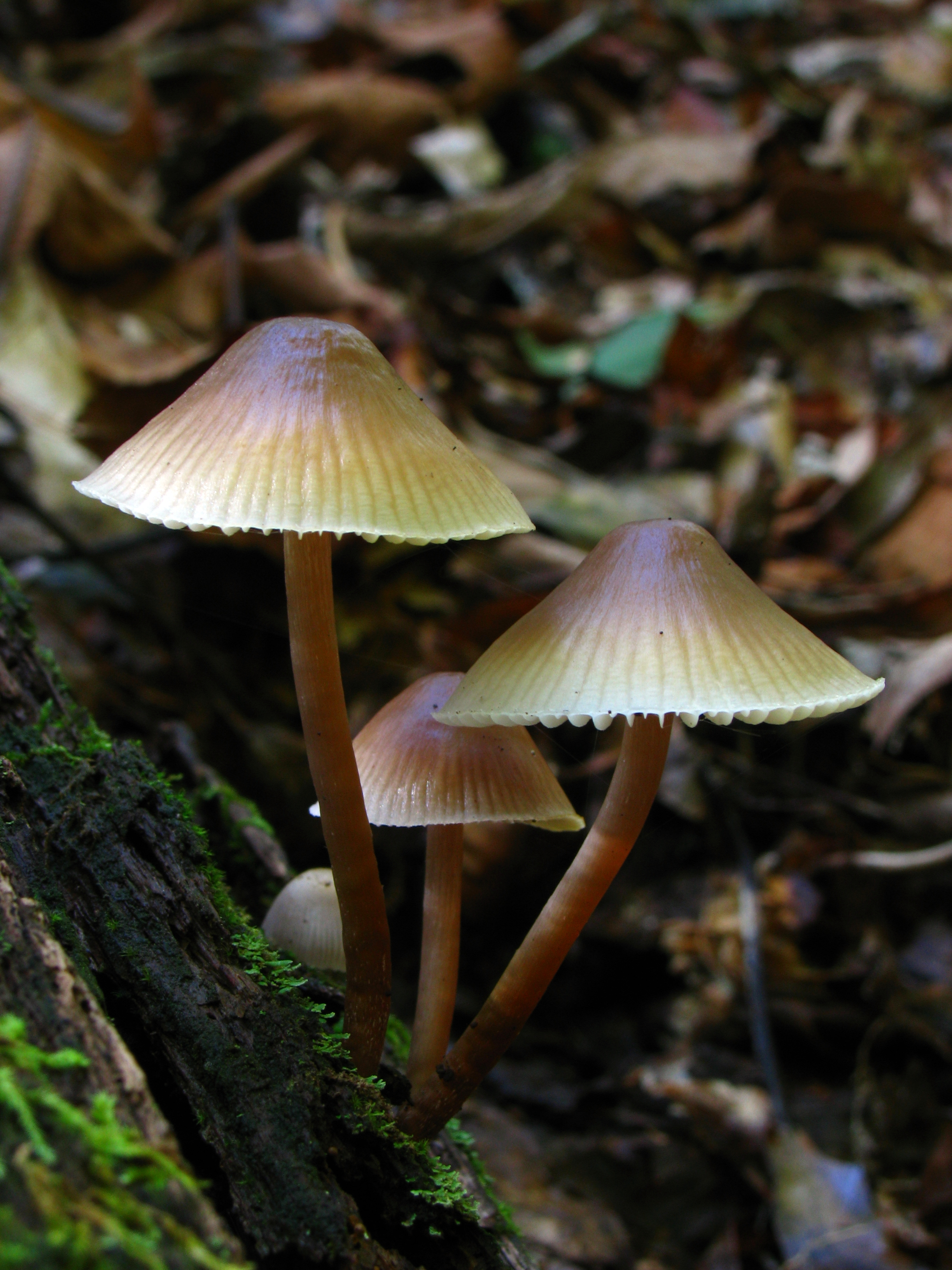

Scientific classification
- Kingdom: Fungi
- Division: Basidiomycota
- Class: Agaricomycetes
- Order: Agaricales
- Family: Mycenaceae
- Genus: Mycena
- Species: M. galericulata

Binomial name
- Mycena galericulata (Scop.) Gray (1821)

Synonyms
- Agaricus galericulatus Scop. (1772); Agaricus conicus Huds. (1778); Agaricus crispus Batsch (1783); Stereopodium galericulatum (Scop.) Earle (1909); Prunulus galericulatus (Scop.) Murrill (1916)

= Mycena galericulata =

Species of fungus

Mycena galericulata
- Mycological characteristics
- Gills on hymenium
- Cap is conical
- Hymenium is adnexed or sinuate
- Stipe is bare
- Spore print is white
- Ecology is saprotrophic
- Edibility is inedible

Mycena galericulata is a mushroom species commonly known as the common bonnet, the toque mycena, the common mycena or the rosy-gill fairy helmet. The type species of the genus Mycena was first described scientifically in 1772, but was not considered a Mycena until 1821.

It is quite variable in color, size, and shape, which makes it somewhat difficult to reliably identify in the field. The caps can reach 4 cm (1.6 in) in diameter, with distinct radial grooves, particularly at the margin. The cap's color varies from grayish brown to dark brown and the shape ranges from bell-like to bluntly conical to flattened with an umbo. The cap's flesh has a mealy odor and taste. The stem is hollow, white, tough and thin, without a ring and often roots deeply into the wood on which it grows. The gills are white to grayish or even pinkish when mature and are connected by distinct cross-veins. The spore print is white and the gills are pink at maturity, which can lead to possible confusion with Pluteus species.

M. galericulata mushrooms grow mostly in clusters on the well-decayed stumps of deciduous and coniferous trees from spring to autumn. It is common and widespread in the entire temperate zone of the Northern Hemisphere, but it has also been reported from Africa. It is possibly edible but of little interest.

== Taxonomy ==
The fungus was first described scientifically as Agaricus galericulatus by Italian mycologist Giovanni Antonio Scopoli in 1772, and sanctioned under this name by Elias Magnus Fries in his 1821 Systema Mycologicum. That same year, Samuel Frederick Gray transferred the species to the genus Mycena. Synonyms for the species include Agaricus conicus named by William Hudson in 1778, Agaricus crispus described by August Johann Georg Karl Batsch in 1893, Stereopodium galericulatum by Franklin Sumner Earle in 1909, and Prunulus galericulatus by William Alphonso Murrill in 1916.

Mycena galericulata is the type species of the genus Mycena. It is classified in section Mycena of Mycena in the infrageneric scheme of Rudolph Arnold Maas Geesteranus. In the older (1947) classification of Alexander H. Smith, he placed it in the subgenus Eumycena, section Typicae—"a most monotonous series of blackish, brown, gray, bluish-gray, or brownish-gray species mostly with ascending gills and generally large to moderate stature."

The specific epithet galericulata is derived from the Latin galer, and means "with a small hat". Gray called it the "helmetted high-stool". It is commonly known as the "common bonnet", the "toque mycena", or the "rosy-gill fairy helmet".

== Description ==
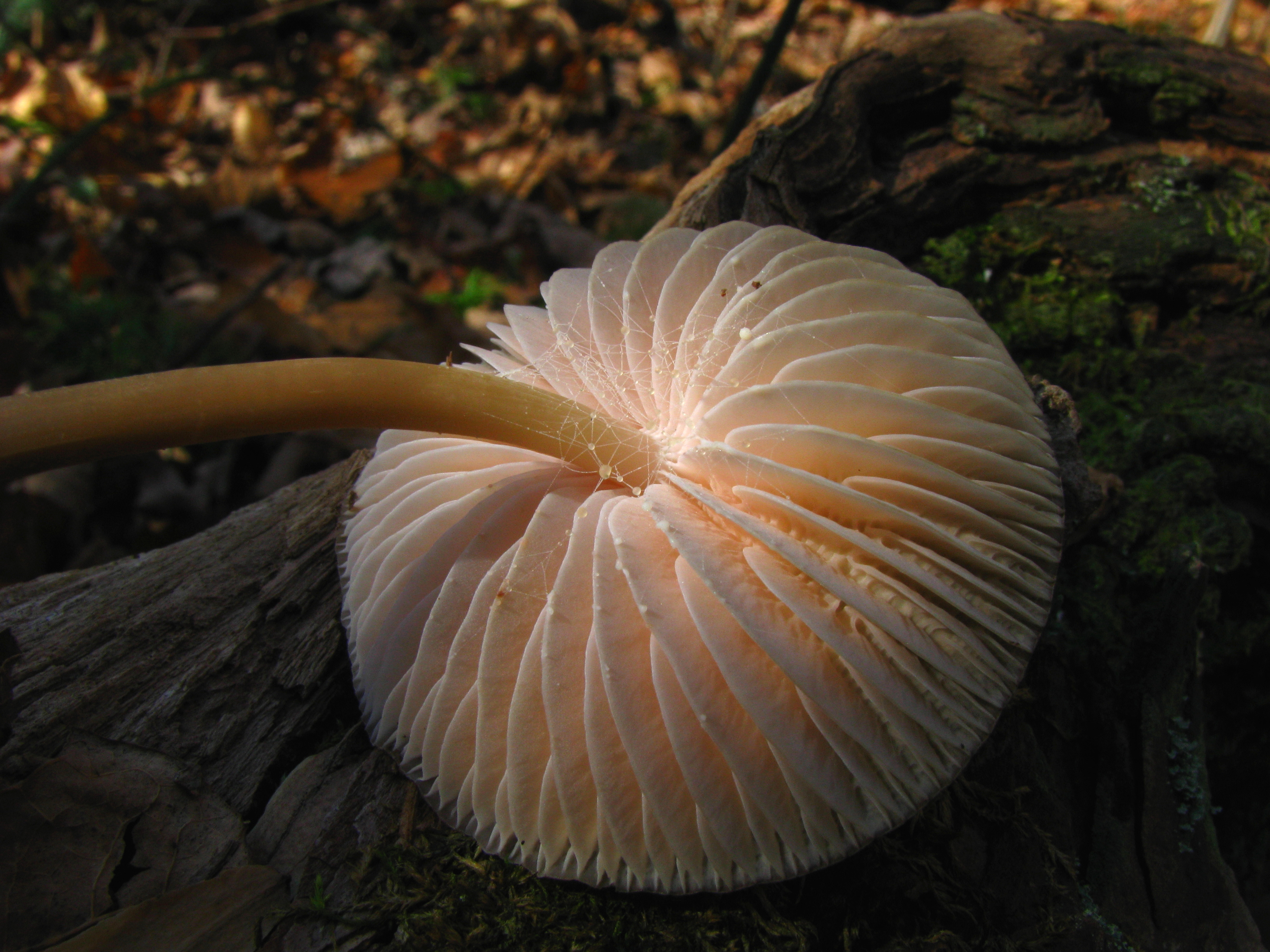
The gills are interspersed with several tiers of lamellulae, and are strongly interveined.

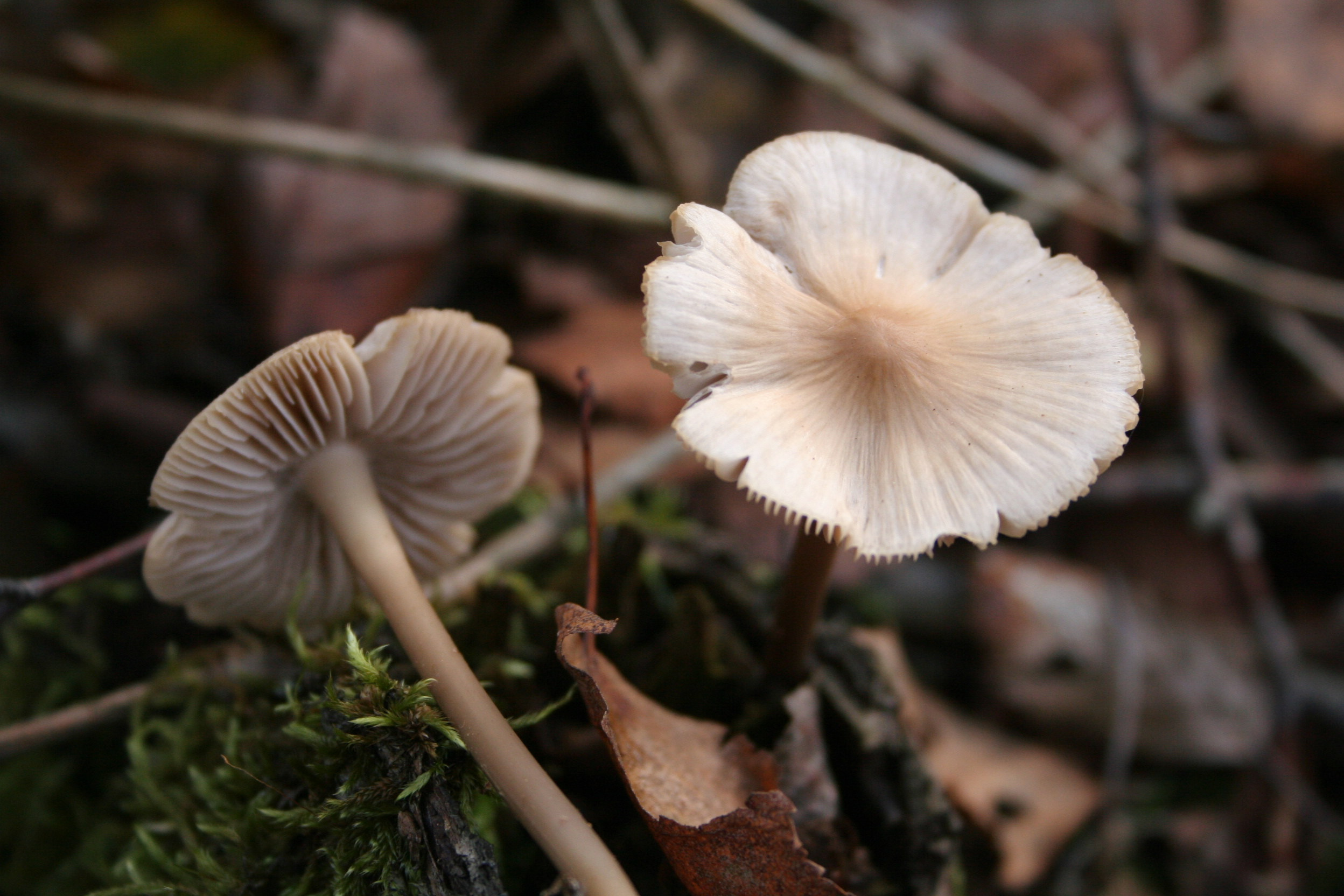
The cap of this older specimen is flattened with splits at the margin; it has a broad umbo and radial striations.

The cap of M. galericulata is roughly conical when young, and eventually becomes broadly bell-shaped or with a broad umbo that can reach diameters of 2–5 cm (0.8–2.0 in). The cap margin is initially somewhat curved inward, but soon evens out or even becomes uplifted, and often splits radially in age. The surface has radial grooves that extend nearly to the center, and feels greasy but not sticky. The color is somewhat buff-brown on the margin, and fades gradually to pale dirty tan to dirty cinnamon-brown. The flesh is thick in the center of the cap and tapers evenly to the margin, and is watery gray, with a cartilage-like texture. The odor and taste are mildly to strongly farinaceous (similar to the smell of freshly ground flour), to radish-like.

The gills are narrowly attached (adnexed) to broadly attached or sinuate. The gill spacing ranges from close to somewhat distantly spaced, with 26–36 gills reaching the stem; there are additionally three or four tiers of lamellulae (short gills that do not extend completely from the cap margin to the stem). The gills are strongly intervenose (possessing cross-veins), moderately broad (5–7 mm), white or grayish white, soon flushed with pale pink, with even edges. The stem is 5–9 cm (2.0–3.5 in) long, 2–4 mm (0.08–0.16 in) thick, equal in width throughout, and with a cartilaginous texture. It is hollow, not hairy, either smooth or twisted with longitudinal striations, often with a long pseudorrhiza (a subterranean elongation of the stem) at the base. The stem color is pale grayish white on the upper portion, and pale grayish black below; the base becomes somewhat dirty brown in age, but does not develop reddish stains.

Mycena galericulata produces a whitish spore print. The spores are ellipsoid, 8–10 by 5.5–7 μm, and amyloid—which means they will turn blue-black to black when stained with Melzer's reagent. The basidia (spore-bearing cells) have stout sterigmata, and measure 34–40 by 7–9 μm. They may be either two-spored or four-spored. There are numerous club-shaped to rounded cheilocystidia (cystidia on the gill edge), that measure 32–40 by 8–12 μm; their apices or the entire enlarged portion bear rodlike projections that become increasingly elongated and branched in age. There are no pleurocystidia (cystidia on the gill face). The gill tissue has a very thin cuticle, under which is a narrow hypoderm, while the remainder of the tissue comprises densely matted tufts of mycelia, and stains deep vinaceous-brown in iodine. Clamp connections are present in the hyphae of the four-spored forms.

=== Similar species ===
All lookalikes are smaller than this one, although ranging in colours and odours.

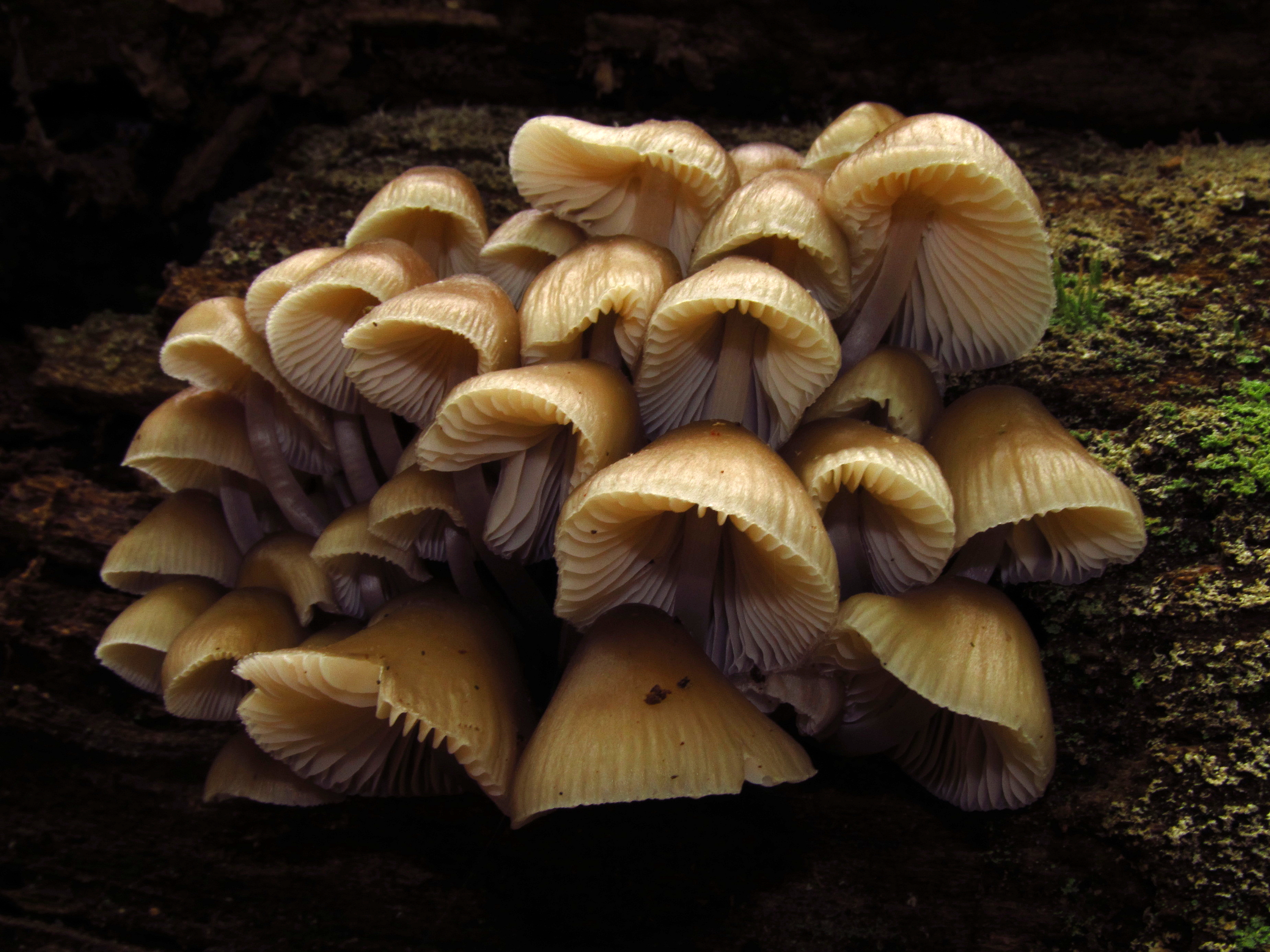
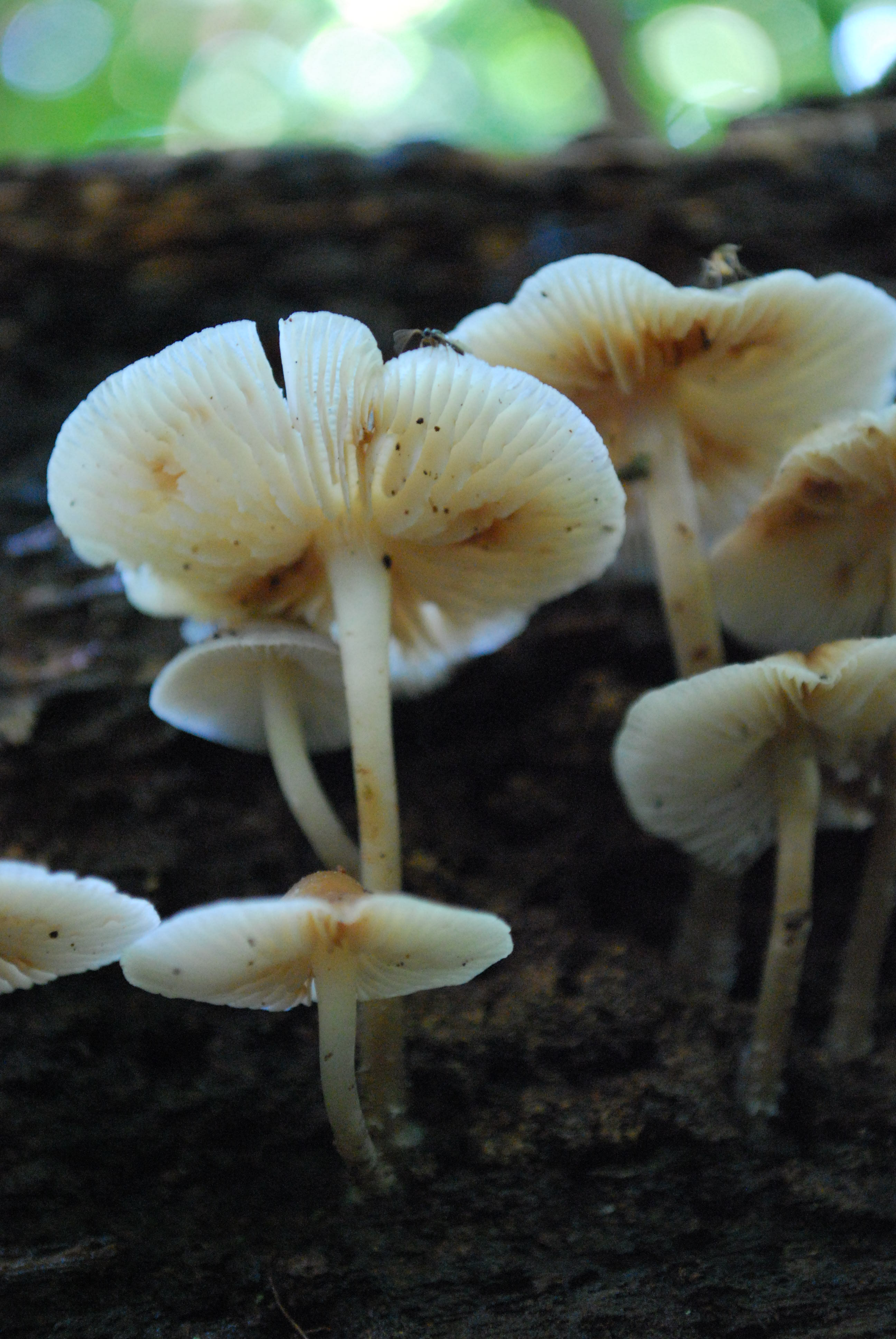
Lookalikes M. inclinata (left) and M. maculata (right) can often be distinguished from M. galericulata by the stains that develop on the gills as they mature.

The winter bonnet (M. tintinnabulum) is a northern European species that is much smaller (cap diameter up to 2.6 cm (1.0 in) across) and has a brown cap, and has ragged hairs at the base. It generally appears in late autumn to early winter on the stumps of deciduous trees, especially beech. It has pip-shaped spores that are smaller than M. galericulata, around 4.5–5.5 by 2.5–2.8 μm. M. maculata develops pink stains on its gills as it matures; its spores are 7–9 by 4–5 μm. Another similar species is M. inclinata, which can be distinguished by gills bearing reddish spots, which may become entirely red with age. It also has whitish, slender, threadlike flecks on the stalk. M. parabolica is thinner, and more fragile. Another Mycena that grows in clusters on decaying hardwoods is M. haematopus, but this species has a vinaceous-brown cap with a scalloped margin, and a stem that bleeds reddish-brown juice when injured. M. excisa closely resembles M. galericulata, but can be distinguished microscopically by the presence of both smooth and roughened cystidia (bearing finger-like projections).

== Distribution and ecology ==
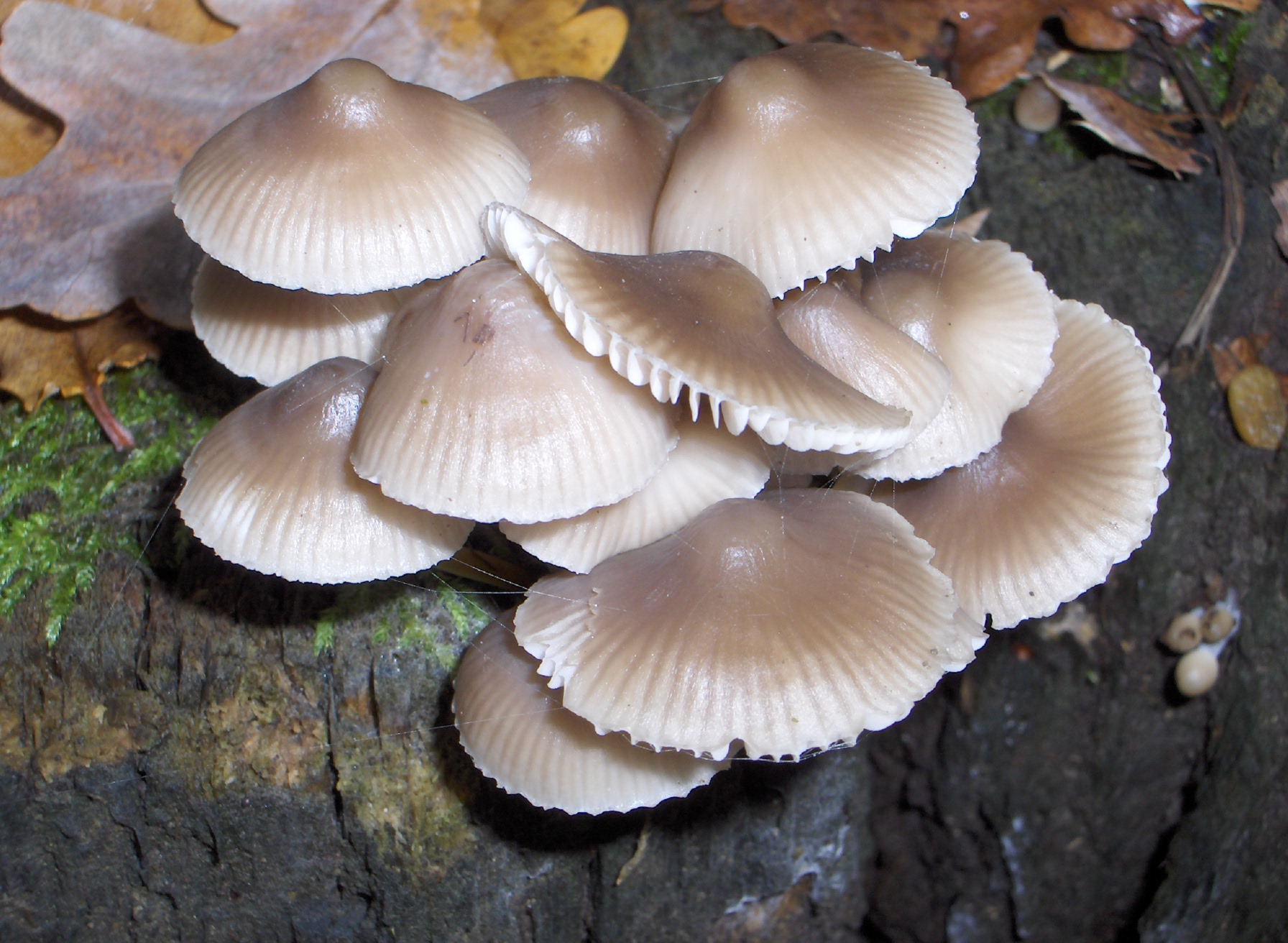
Fruit bodies typically grow in clusters on rotting wood.

Mycena galericulata is a very common and widely distributed species, found throughout the entire temperate zone of the Northern Hemisphere. In the United States, it occurs throughout eastern North America and also along the Pacific Coast. It has also been collected in Edo State, Nigeria. Although the mushroom has occasionally been reported from Australia, these collections are probably based on misidentifications. In 2025, the mushroom was collected in China where it grows on rotten wood and dead branches of coniferous trees in Inner Mongolia, and in central and northeast China.

Mycena galericulata is saprobic, and grows on decaying hardwood and softwood sticks, chips, logs, and stumps. It can also grow from submerged wood, which may give it a terrestrial appearance. It typically grows in small clusters or sometimes singly. The fungus fruits from late spring to early winter. A study of litter-decomposing fungi in a coniferous forest in Finland showed that M. galericulata produces extracellular hydrolytic enzymes in the humus and eluvial soil, including β-glucosidase, β-xylosidase, α-glucosidase, butyrate esterase and sulphatase. The enzymes form complexes with inorganic and organic particles in the soil and break down (depolymerize) biopolymers such as cellulose, hemicellulose, and starch, which contributes to the cycling of carbon and nutrients. The presence of lead contamination in the soil decreases both the growth and the extracellular hydrolytic enzyme activity of M. galericulata.

This mushroom has been recorded as a possible occasional food of adults of the pleasing fungus beetle Tritoma humeralis

== Edibility ==
Some sources list the species as inedible, with a "mildly rancid" smell and a taste ranging from rancid to farinaceous. According to David Arora it is edible but it may resemble questionable species. According to one source, the mushrooms can be "stewed gently in their own juice and then seasoned with salt, pepper and butter". Like many other brownish mycenas, it is of low interest due to its smallish size and delicate consistency.
