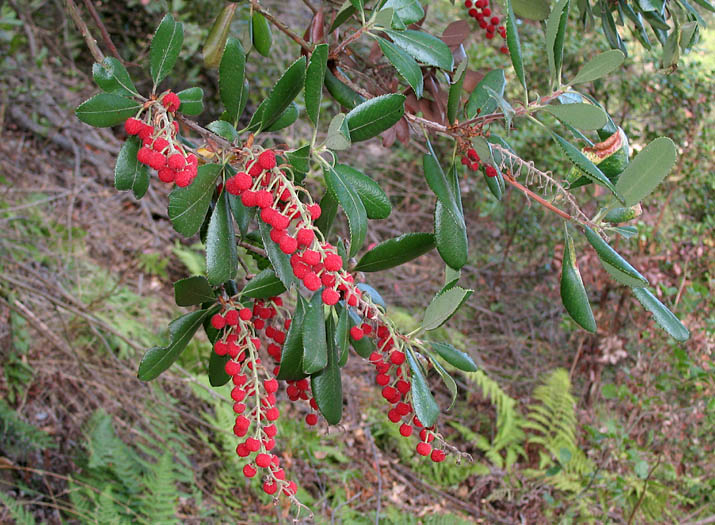
- Comarostaphylis diversifolia

Scientific classification
- Kingdom: Plantae
- Clade: Tracheophytes
- Clade: Angiosperms
- Clade: Eudicots
- Clade: Asterids
- Order: Ericales
- Family: Ericaceae
- Subfamily: Arbutoideae
- Genus: Comarostaphylis; Zucc.

Species
- About 10, see text.

= Comarostaphylis =

Genus of flowering plants

Comarostaphylis is a genus of shrubs in the heath family native to the Americas from California in the United States to Panama. These are hairy, glandular shrubs to small trees with shreddy bark, often quite similar to their close relatives, the manzanitas.

Species:

- Comarostaphylis arbutoides
- Comarostaphylis discolor
- Comarostaphylis diversifolia
- Comarostaphylis glaucescens
- Comarostaphylis lanata
- Comarostaphylis longifolia
- Comarostaphylis mucronata
- Comarostaphylis polifolia
- Comarostaphylis sharpii
- Comarostaphylis spinulosa
