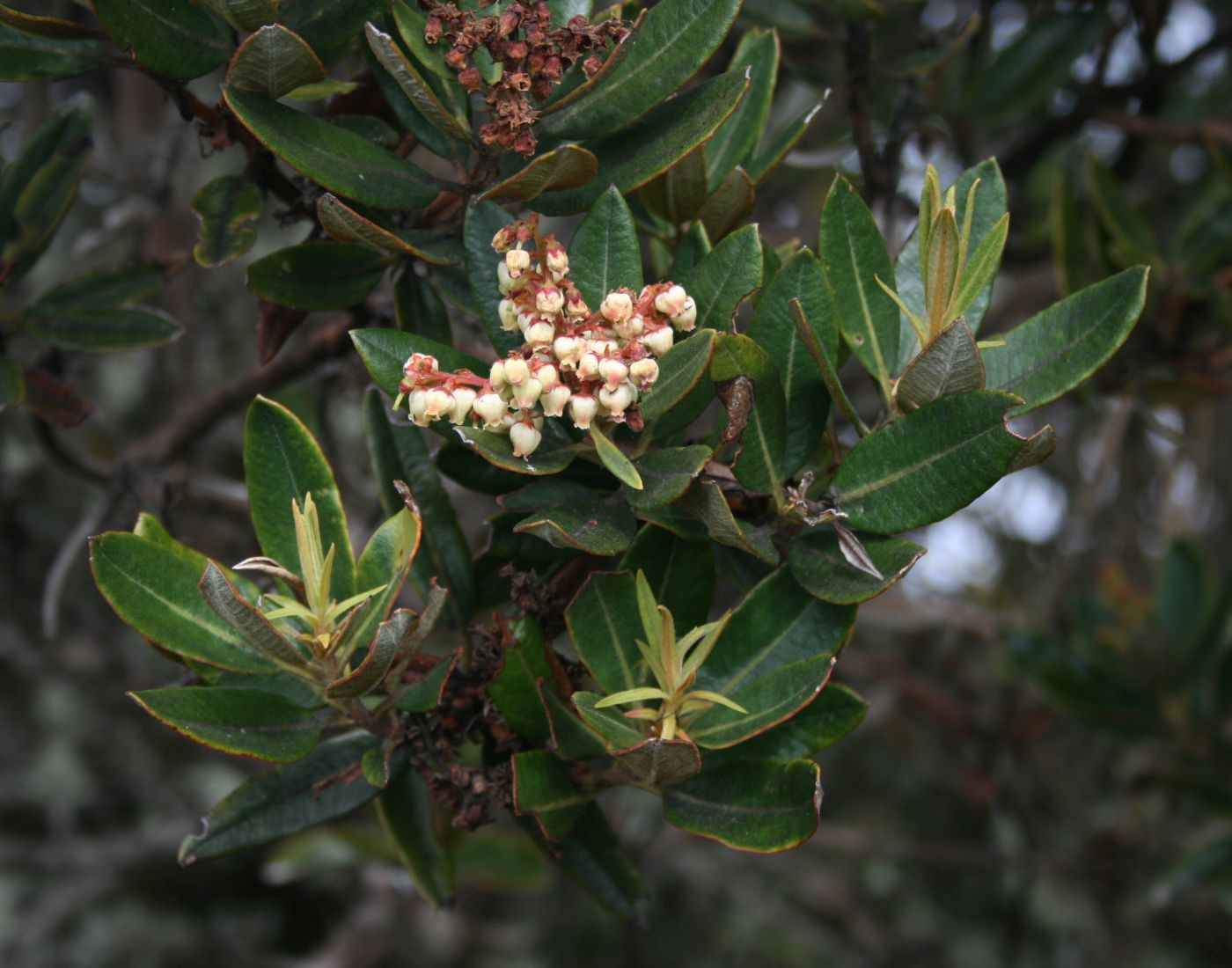

Scientific classification
- Kingdom: Plantae
- Clade: Tracheophytes
- Clade: Angiosperms
- Clade: Eudicots
- Clade: Asterids
- Order: Ericales
- Family: Ericaceae
- Genus: Comarostaphylis
- Species: C. arbutoides

Binomial name
- Comarostaphylis arbutoides Lindley

= Comarostaphylis arbutoides =

Species of flowering plant

Comarostaphylis arbutoides is a species of shrub in the heath family. Its range extends from central Mexico south to Guatemala, Honduras, Nicaragua, Costa Rica, and western Panama. It is found in oak and pine forests in mountainous locations, and on the summits of Central American volcanoes, at elevations from 1,350 to 3,800 m (4,430 to 12,470 ft). There are two subspecies: arbutoides, distinguished by the presence of a rust-colored tomentum on the leaf underside, and costaricensis which lacks the tomentum.
