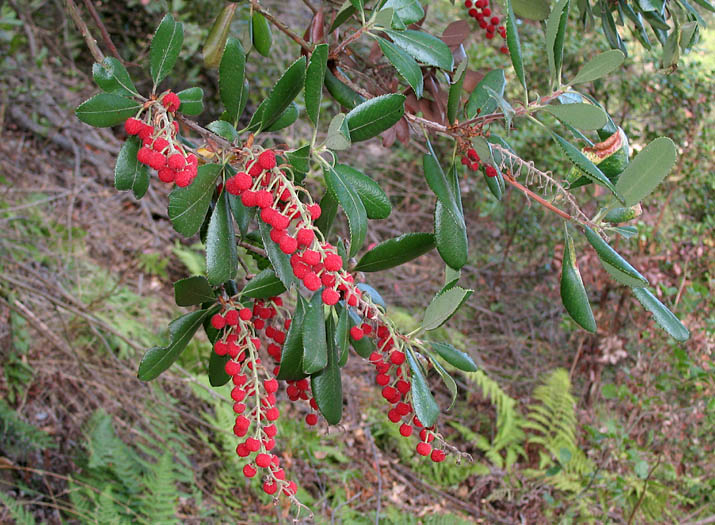

Conservation status
- Near Threatened (IUCN 3.1)

- Vulnerable (NatureServe)

Scientific classification
- Kingdom: Plantae
- Clade: Tracheophytes
- Clade: Angiosperms
- Clade: Eudicots
- Clade: Asterids
- Order: Ericales
- Family: Ericaceae
- Genus: Comarostaphylis
- Species: C. diversifolia

Binomial name
- Comarostaphylis diversifolia (Parry) Greene

= Comarostaphylis diversifolia =

Species of flowering plant

Comarostaphylis diversifolia, known by the common names summer holly and California comarostaphylos, is a species of shrub in the heath family.

It is native to Southern California and northern Baja California, where it grows in coastal chaparral habitat.

== Description ==
Comarostaphylis diversifolia is an erect shrub which can exceed 4 metres (13 ft) in height. Its bark is gray and shreddy and the tough, evergreen leaves are oval in shape and sometimes toothed.

The inflorescence is a raceme of urn-shaped flowers very similar to those of the related shrubs, the manzanitas. The fruit is a bright red, juicy drupe with a bumpy skin.

=== Subspecies ===
There are two subspecies:

- Comarostaphylis diversifolia ssp. diversifolia - native to the coastal hills of Southern California and Baja California.
- Comarostaphylis diversifolia ssp. planifolia - native to the Channel Islands of California and the Transverse Ranges north of Los Angeles.

== See also ==
- California chaparral and woodlands
  - California coastal sage and chaparral
