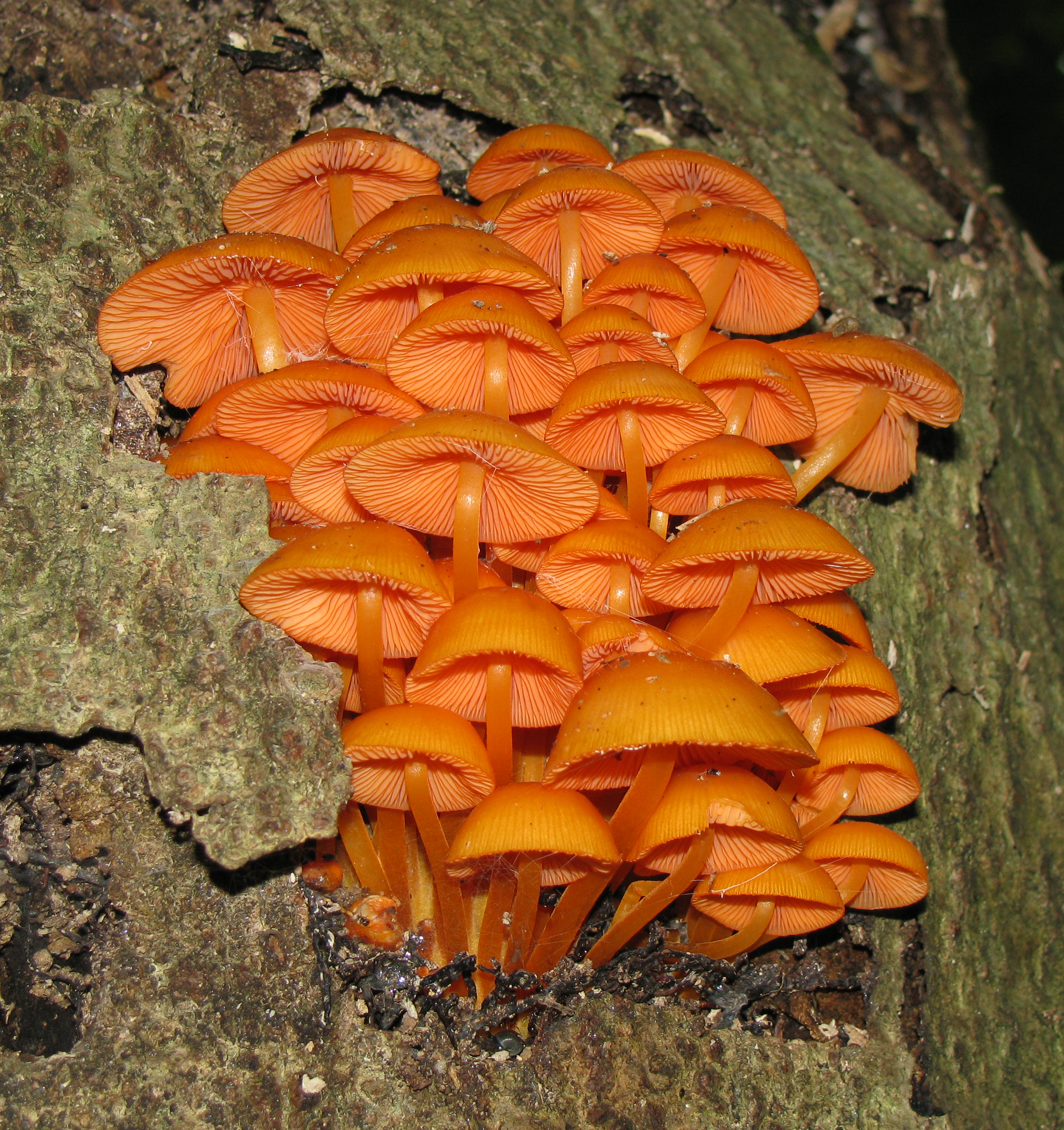
- The orange mycena, photographed in West Virginia, USA.
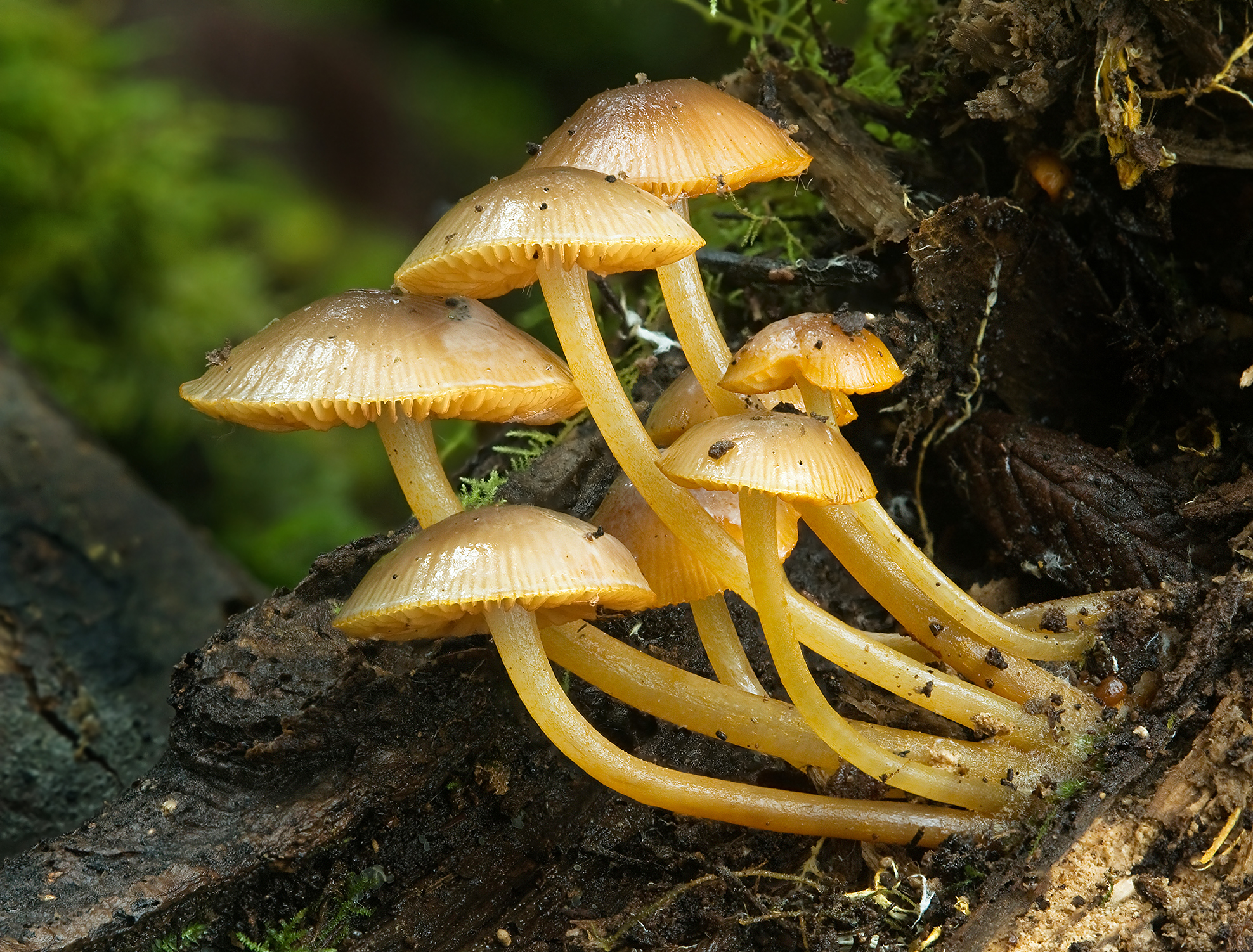
- Mature Mycena leaiana var. australis (note the faded orange colour) in Mount Field National Park.

Scientific classification
- Kingdom: Fungi
- Division: Basidiomycota
- Class: Agaricomycetes
- Order: Agaricales
- Family: Mycenaceae
- Genus: Mycena
- Species: M. leaiana

Binomial name
- Mycena leaiana (Berk.) Sacc. (1891)

Synonyms
- Agaricus leaianus Berk. (1845)

= Mycena leaiana =

Species of fungus

Mycena leaiana
- Mycological characteristics
- Gills on hymenium
- Cap is conical
- Hymenium is adnexed
- Stipe is bare
- Spore print is white
- Ecology is saprotrophic
- Edibility is inedible

Mycena leaiana, commonly known as the orange mycena or Lea's mycena, is a species of saprobic fungi in the genus Mycena, family Mycenaceae. They have bright orange caps and stalks and reddish-orange gill edges. Typically found in North America, a variety, M. leaiana var. australis, can be found in Australasia.

The mushrooms usually grow in dense clusters on deciduous logs. The pigment responsible for the orange color in this species has antibiotic properties.

== Taxonomy ==
Originally named Agaricus leajanus by the English biologist Miles Joseph Berkeley in 1845, Pier Andrea Saccardo was later (1891) to move it to the genus Mycena when the large genus Agaricus was divided. The species was named after Thomas Gibson Lea (1785–1844), a mushroom collector from Ohio who had sent a collection of specimens to Berkeley for identification.

== Description ==
The hygrophanous cap is 1 to 4 centimetres (0.39 to 1.57 in) in diameter, and initially rounded or bell-shaped but becoming expanded and convex with age, often with a depression in the center. The color is a bright orange that fades as the mushroom matures. The surface of the cap is sticky, especially in moist weather, and smooth, while the margin often has striations. The trama is soft, watery, and white. The gills are adnexed in attachment (gills narrowly attached/tapering toward stem so that their attachment is almost free), crowded together, and yellowish in color, with the color deepening to bright orange-red at the edges. The deepening in color at the edges is due to an orange pigment that is contained largely within cells called cheilocystidia. If handled, the yellow pigment will rub off and stain the skin.

The stipe is typically 3 to 7 cm (1.2 to 2.8 in) long by 2–4 mm thick. The diameter of the stipe is more or less equal throughout its length, although it may be slightly enlarged at the base. It is orange in color, and has fine hairs on the upper portion, and denser hairs at the base. The orange mycena has no distinctive taste, and a slightly mealy odor. The spores are elliptical in shape, smooth, amyloid, and have dimensions of 7–10 × 5–6 μm. The spore print is white.

Mycena leaiana var. australis is a variety of Mycena leaiana found in Australia and New Zealand. In all but the color it is similar to M. leaiana. However, M. leaiana had been found primarily in the east of the United States (and specifically not on the Pacific coast at all) upon the discovery of specimens in Australia. Given this wide geographical separation (as well as the difference in cap color) a new varietal name was proposed.

=== Similar species ===
Mycena texensis A.H. Sm. (1937) is closely related, but has been described as having "grayish colors of the cap". It is better distinguished microscopically: it has smaller spores, shorter and narrower basidia, and distinctive cystidia.

== Habitat and distribution ==
Mycena leaiana is a common species, and grows in dense cespitose clusters (with stipes sharing a single point of origin) on hardwood logs and branches. It is a North American species, and has been reported throughout the eastern and central U.S. and Canada. The variant Mycena leaiana var. australis can be found in Australia and New Zealand.

== Bioactive compounds ==
Mycena leaiana produces the orange pigment leainafulvene, a member of the class of chemical compounds known as isoilludanes. Leainafulvene has weak antibacterial activity against Acinetobacter calcoaceticus, and has pronounced cytotoxic activity towards tumor cells. It also has mutagenic activity, as measured by the Ames test.
