= Armillaria aotearoa =

Scientific classification
- Domain: Eukaryota
- Kingdom: Fungi
- Division: Basidiomycota
- Class: Agaricomycetes
- Order: Agaricales
- Family: Physalacriaceae
- Genus: Armillaria
- Species: A. aotearoa

Binomial name
- Armillaria aotearoa Hood & Ramsfield (2016)

Species of fungus

Armillaria aotearoa is a species of mushroom-forming fungus in the family Physalacriaceae. This plant pathogen species is one of four Armillaria species that have been identified in New Zealand, the others being A. novae-zelandiae, A. limonea, and A. hinnulea.

== Description ==
Armillaria aotearoa produces fruiting bodies (basidiomata) that grow in clusters (caespitose), with centrally positioned stalks supporting the caps. The cap, or pileus, measures between 35 and 60 mm across and is pinkish-brown to brown. The surface is dry and moderately smooth, scattered with small, dark granular scales that are more concentrated toward the centre. Initially convex, the cap flattens over time but retains a distinctive broad zone at the edges that darkens when it absorbs moisture (hygrophanous) but does not become sticky. The flesh of the cap is off-white to pale pink.

The gills are attached near the top of the stalk (adnexed), moderately packed, and pale pink in colour. The stalk, or stipe, ranges from 35 to 90 mm in length, with a bulbous base and pale pinkish-brown colour that may show faint green or yellowish tones. It is dry, with tiny, scattered fibrils, and eventually hollows out as it matures. The flesh of the stipe is also off-white to pale pink. A partial veil forms a ring (annulus) around the stalk, with the underside matching the colour of the stipe and featuring concentrically arranged darker flecks.

Armillaria aotearoa has rhizomorphs—root-like structures typical of the genus—that are black and show uneven branching. Microscopic examination reveals that the tissue within the gills (gill trama) is composed of thick-walled, inflated hyphae arranged in layers, with no clamp connections observed. The basidia (spore-producing cells) are club-shaped, bearing four spores each, and measure 31–49 by 5–9.5 μm. The spores are smooth, thin- to moderately thick-walled, ellipsoid to ovoid, and range from 7.5 to 10.5 μm in length and 5 to 7.5 μm in width; they are non-amyloid, meaning they do not stain with iodine, and appear transparent (hyaline) under a microscope. The spore print is white. The cap surface, or pileipellis, is made of a firm, compact layer of hyphae arranged in two sub-layers: an upper brownish layer and a lower colourless layer that gradually blends with the flesh of the cap.

== Range ==
The species is known from the Taupo region of the North Island and Mid-Canterbury region of the South Island of Aotearoa New Zealand.

== Habitat ==
Armillaria aotearoa is found in southern beech (Nothofagaceae) forests, on woody debris of Fuscospora fusca (Nothofagus fusca), Lophozonia menziesii (Nothofagus menziesii) and Fuscospora cliffortioides (Nothofagus solandri var. cliffortioides).

== Ecology ==
Fruiting occurs between late April and mid-June. Its pathogenicity to introduced and native plants is unknown. Most Armillaria species live have a saprophytically contributing to decomposition of organic material, generally as wood-decay fungi, in forest ecosystems. They become pathogenic when environmental conditions are favourable for infection causing "white rot" root disease.

== Etymology ==
Aotearoa from Te Reo Māori for New Zealand.

== Taxonomy ==
Armillaria aotearoa belongs to the Armillaria hinnulea lineage and also includes A. umbrinobrunnea and A. sparrei.
