= List of Armillaria species =

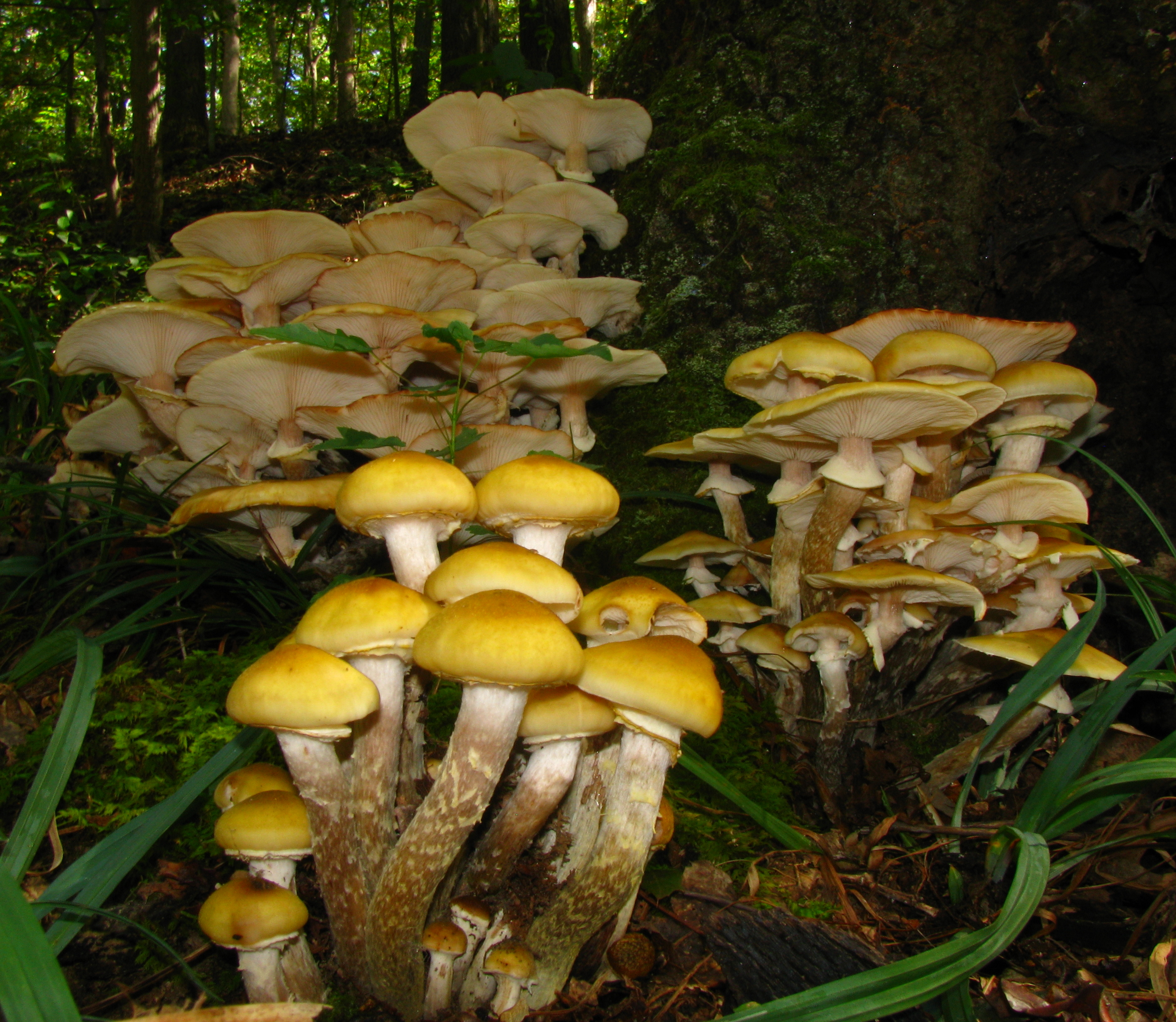
A. mellea is the type species of the genus Armillaria.

Armillaria is a genus of fungi commonly known as honey mushrooms. First treated by Elias Magnus Fries in 1821, and later assigned generic rank by Friedrich Staude in 1857, Armillaria is classified in the family Physalacriaceae of the Agaricales, the gilled mushrooms. The majority of species in Armillaria are saprotrophic and live mainly on dead wood, but some are parasites that can cause root and butt rot in over 600 species of woody plants. Some Armillaria species form mycorrhizae with orchids; others, such as A. gallica, A. mellea, and A. tabescens, are bioluminescent.

Armillaria species form fleshy, white-spored mushrooms with a cottony or membranous veil that typically forms a distinct annulus on the stem. The fruit bodies usually occur in autumn in large clusters at the base of the stem or roots. Armillaria species can produce rhizomorphs—rootlike aggregations of hyphae—that can form massive, long-lasting underground networks. The growth of the rhizomorph networks allows for tree-to-tree spread of the fungus even when direct contact between diseased and healthy plants is not possible.

The genus once served as a wastebasket taxon for many agaric mushrooms with a white spore print, gills attached to the stem, and an annulus. Due largely to differing interpretations on the limits of the genus, over 270 species and varieties have been placed in Armillaria or its synonym Armillariella. A comprehensive 1995 study by Tom Volk and Harold Burdsall evaluated all of the epithets that have been used in Armillaria or Armillariella. They determined that about 40 species belong to Armillaria sensu stricto (in the strict sense); the remaining names belong to species that are distributed among 43 other modern fungal genera.

Many species are difficult or impossible to distinguish from each other using observable characteristics; laboratory incompatibility tests are often used on pure cultures to reliably determine species. Because of the difficulties posed by routine species identification, the use of DNA sequencing and phylogenetic approaches has become a standard method to help clarify relationships between species. Species differ in their geographical distribution and ecological position, host specificity, microscopic and macroscopic features, and also in their aggressiveness in colonizing wood hosts. The following list of Armillaria species is based on the taxonomic overviews provided by Volk and Burdsall in 1995, David Pegler in 2000, and reports of new species that have been published since then.

== Species ==
Key to the table of species below

Image	Photo of the Armillaria species.
Name	The binomial name of the Armillaria species.
Authority	The author citation—the person who first described the species using an available scientific name, eventually combined with the one who placed it in Armillaria, and using standardized abbreviations.
Year	The year in which the species was named, or transferred to the genus Armillaria. Where the actual year of publication (as defined for the purpose of priority) differs from the date given in the material, the latter date is given in quotes.
Distribution	The distribution of the species; unless otherwise indicated, this information is obtained from Volk and Burdsall (1995), and Pegler (2000).

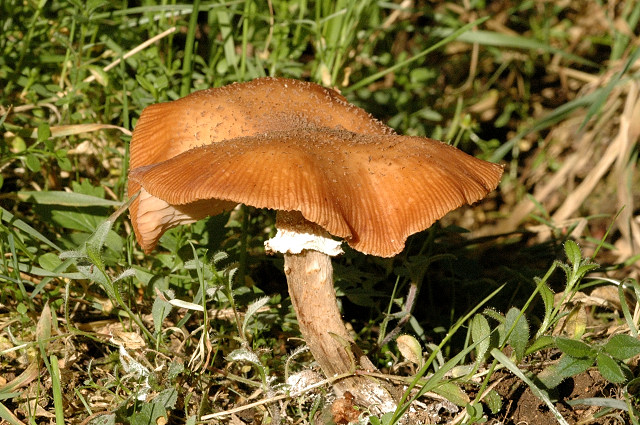
A. borealis

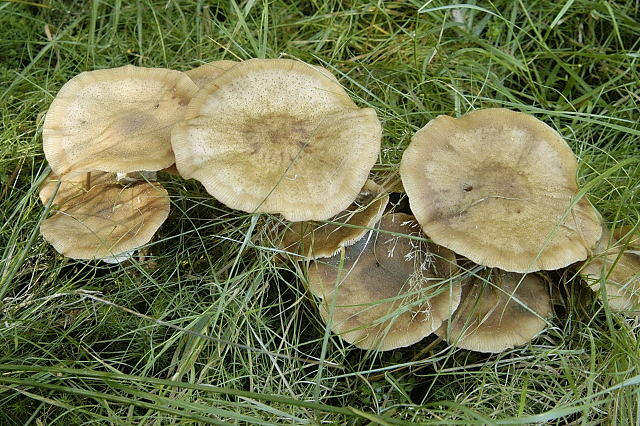
A. cepistipes

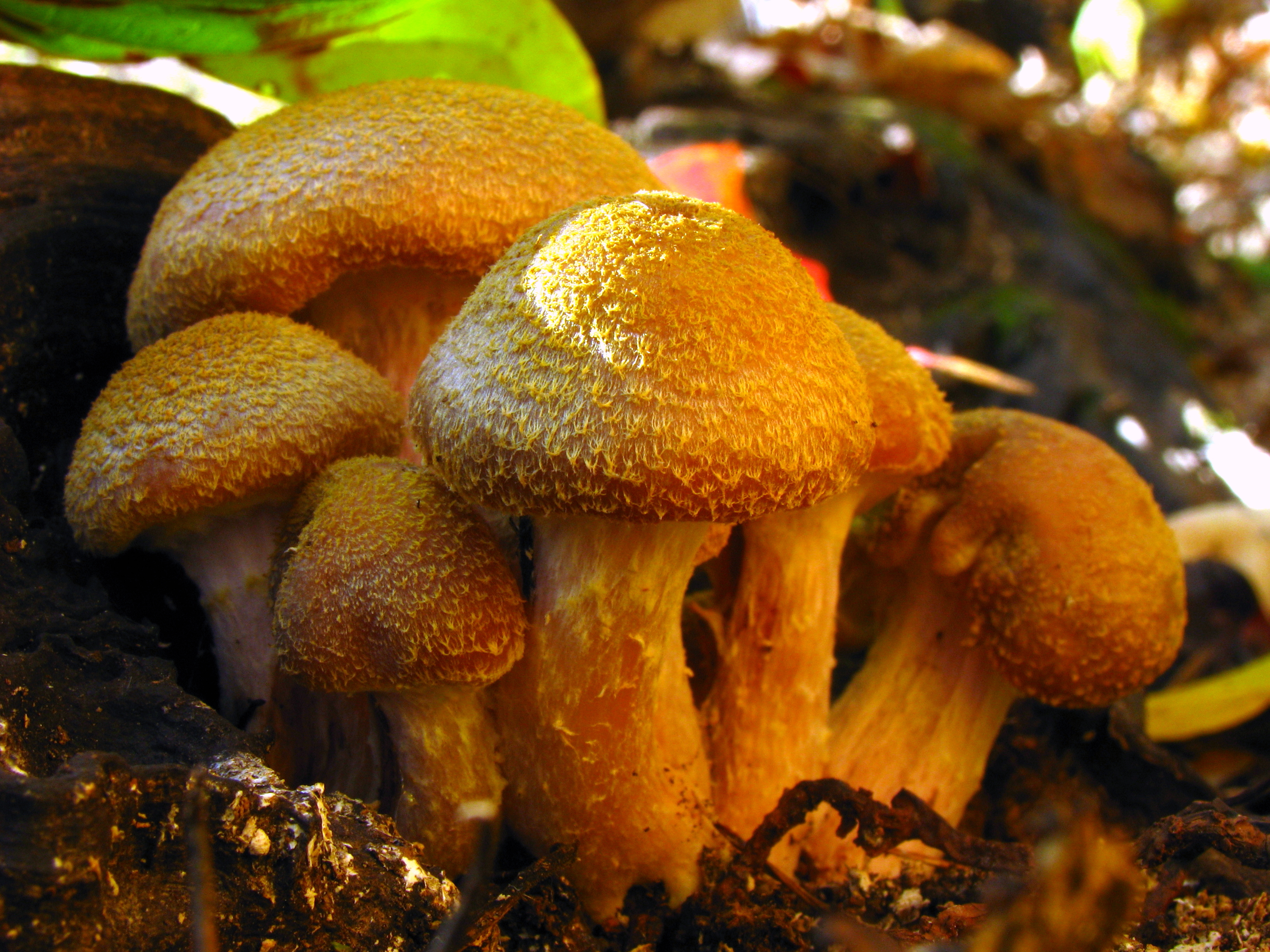
A. gallica

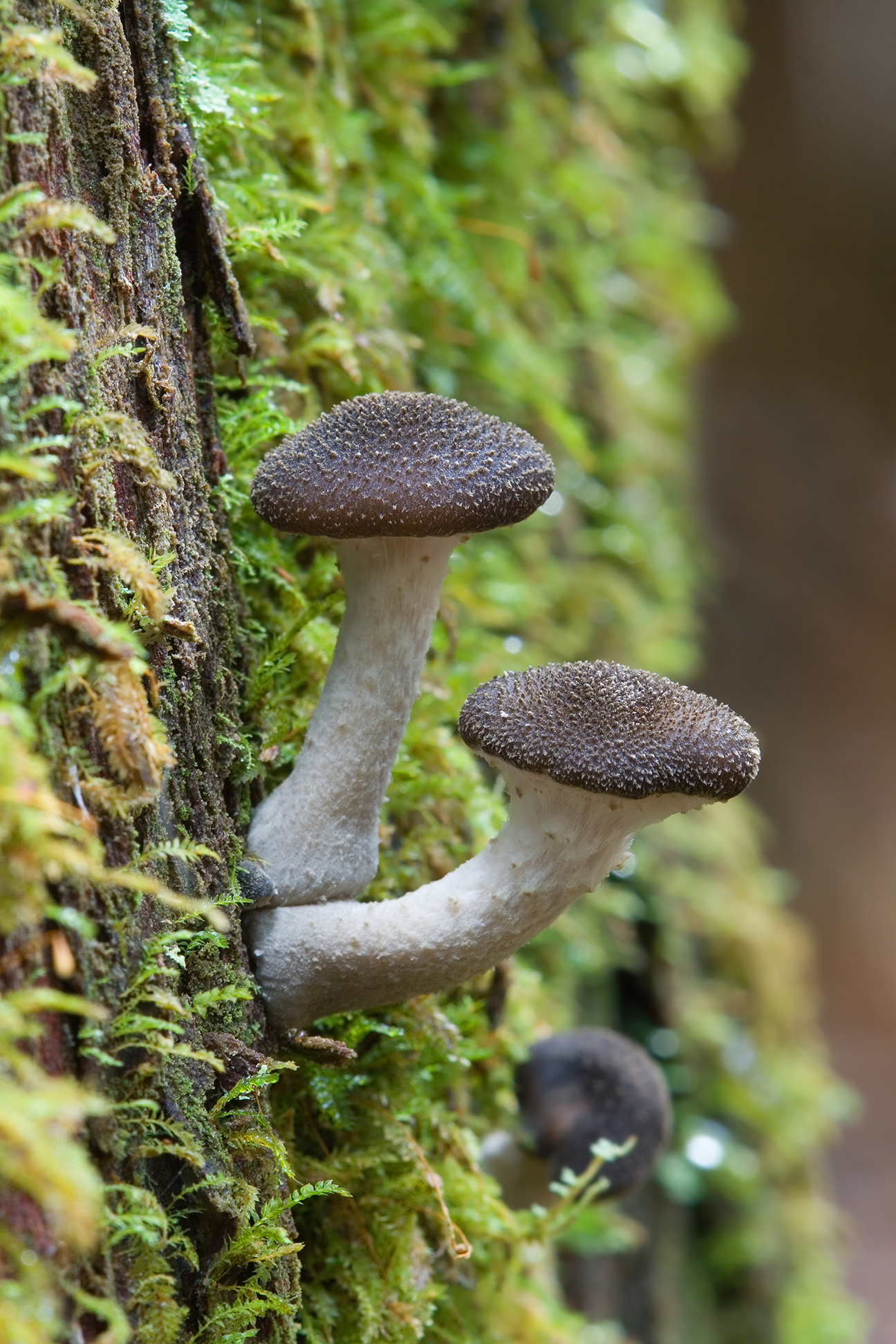
A. hinnulea

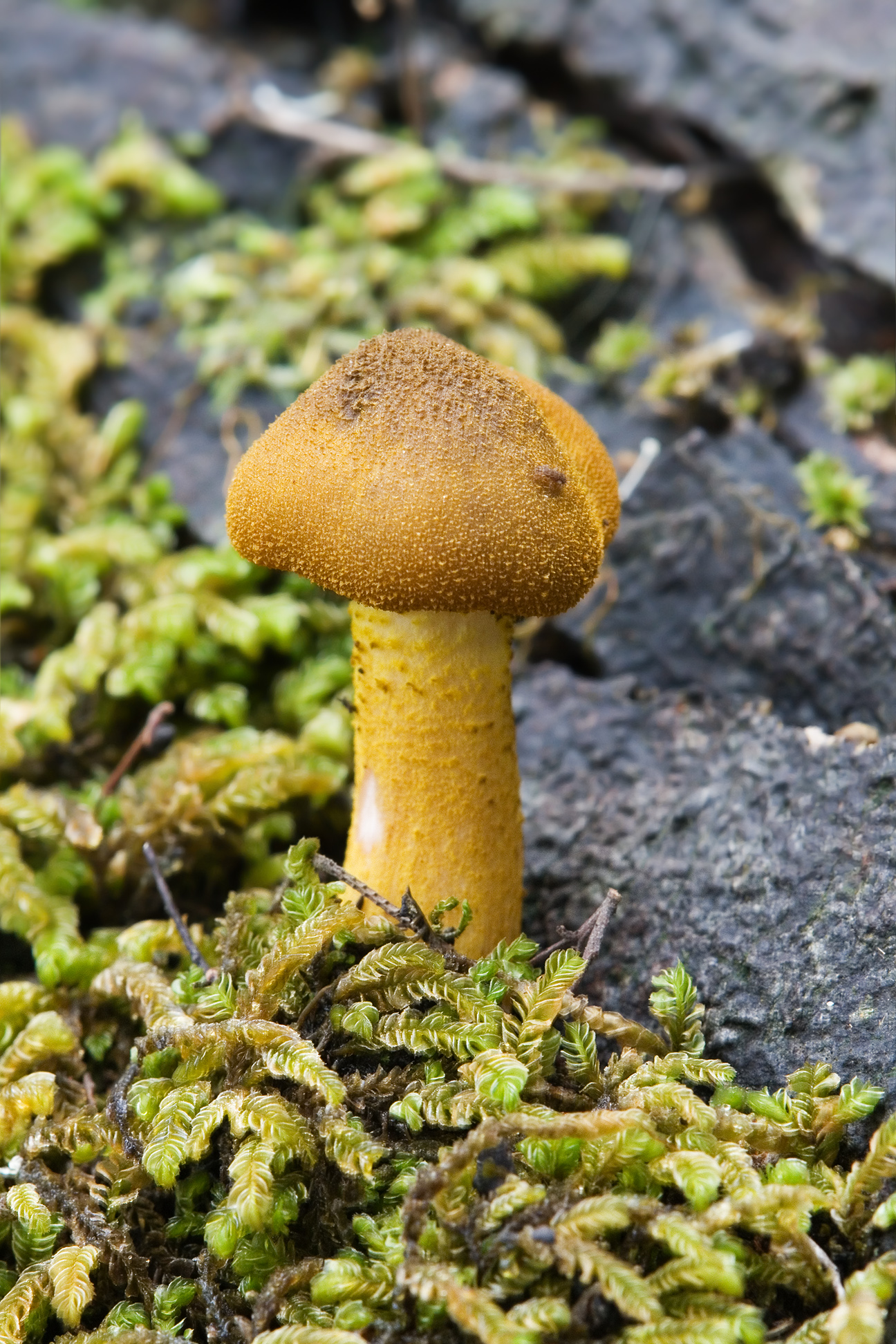
A. luteobubalina

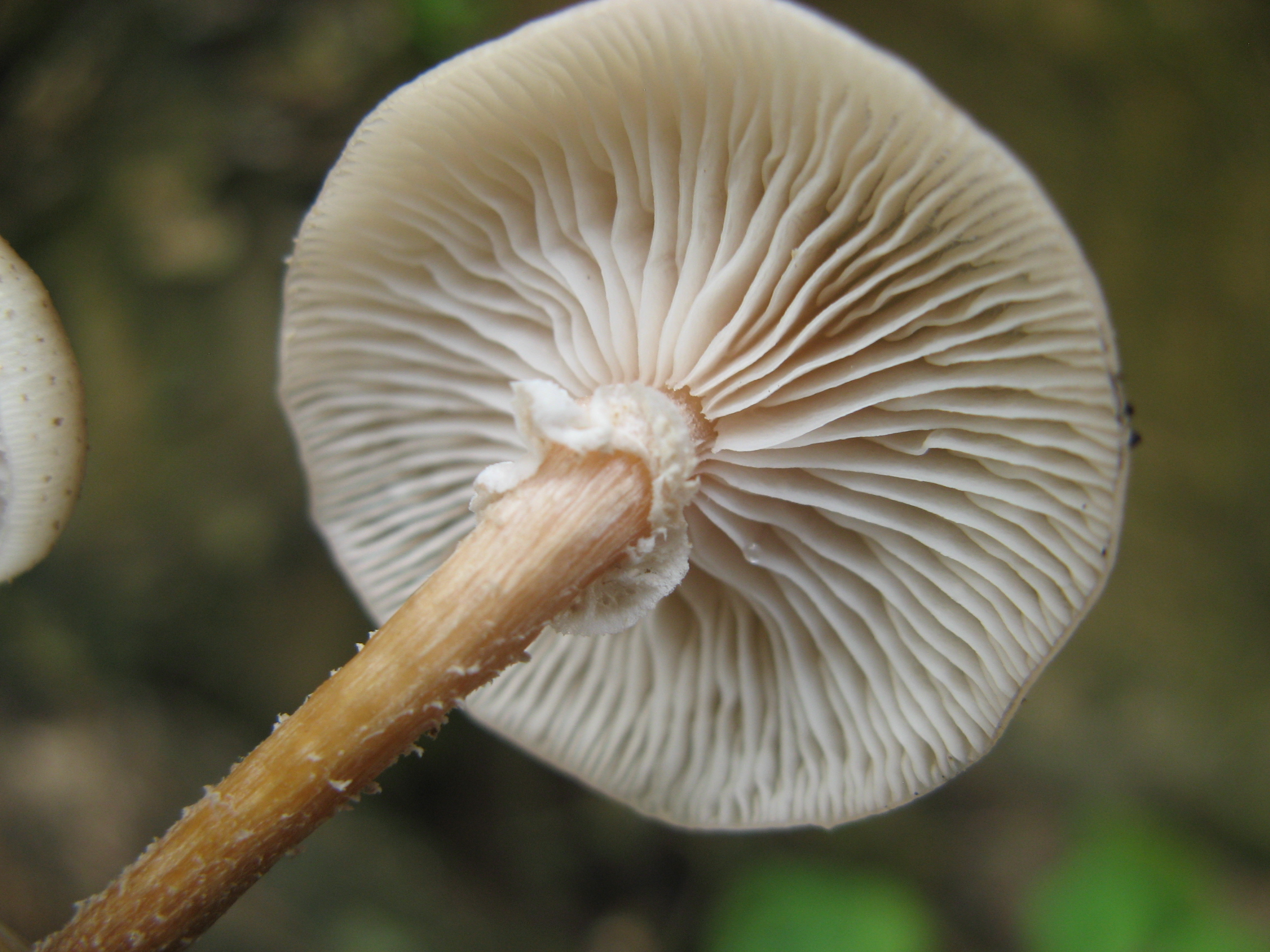
A. puiggarii

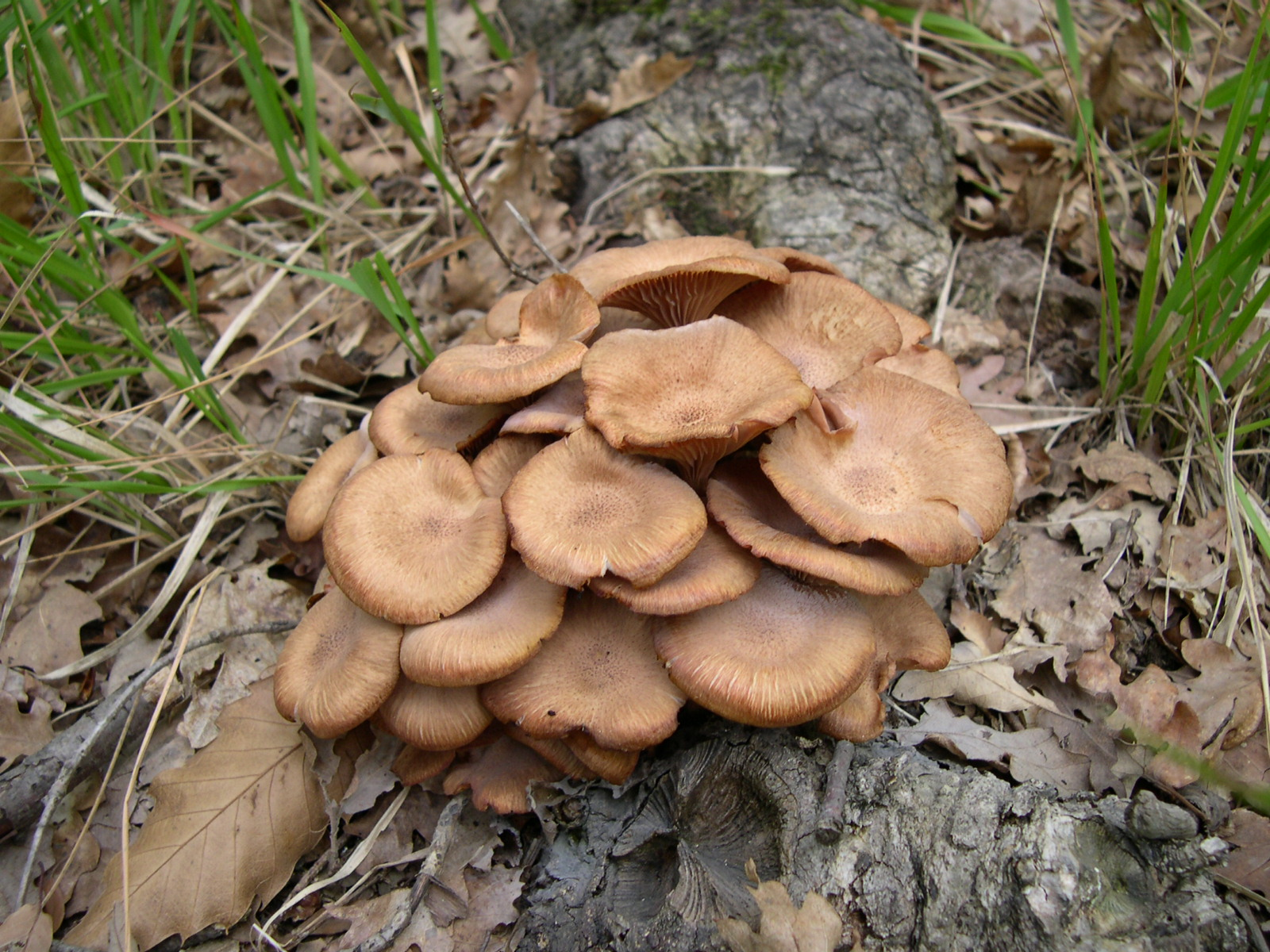
A. tabescens

Image	Name	Authority	Year	Distribution
	Armillaria affinis	(Singer) T.J.Volk & Burds.	1995	Caribbean; Central America
	Armillaria altimontana	Brazee, B.Ortiz, Banik & D.L.Lindner.	2012	Western North America
	Armillaria apalosclera	(Berk.) A.Chandra & Watl.	1982 ("1981")	Asia
	Armillaria aotearoa	Hood and Ramsfield.	2016	New Zealand
	Armillaria borealis	Marxm. & Korhonen	1982	Eurasia
	Armillaria calvescens	Bérubé & Dessur.	1989	Eastern North America
	Armillaria camerunensis	(Henn.) Courtec.	1995	Africa
	Armillaria cepistipes (Note: The original spelling of the species name was cepaestipes.)	Velen.	1920	Eurasia; North America
	Armillaria duplicata	(Berk.) Sacc.	1887	India
	Armillaria ectypa	(Fr.) Lamoure	1965	Europe
	Armillaria fellea	(Hongo) Kile & Watling	1983	Australia
	Armillaria fumosa	Kile & Watling	1983	Australia
	Armillaria fuscipes	Petch	1909	Africa; Asia
	Armillaria gallica	Marxm. & Romagn.	1987	Africa; Europe; Japan; North America
	Armillaria gemina	Bérubé & Dessur.	1989	Eastern North America
	Armillaria griseomellea	(Singer) Kile & Watling	1983	North and South America
	Armillaria heimii (Note: This was a nomen novum for Robert Heim's Clitocybe elegans, as Maurice Beeli had described Armillaria elegans in 1927 (that species is now placed in Cystodermella).)	Pegler	1977	Africa
	Armillaria hinnulea	Kile & Watling	1983	Australasia
	Armillaria jezoensis	J.Y.Cha & Igarashi	1994	Japan
	Armillaria limonea	(G.Stev.) Boesew.	1977	Australasia; South America
	Armillaria luteobubalina (Note: A. montagnei and A. luteobubalina may represent the same species. If this is so, its correct epithet would be montagnei.)	Watling & Kile	1978	Australasia; South America
	Armillaria mellea	(Vahl) P.Kumm.	1871	Eurasia; North America
	Armillaria melleorubens	(Berk. & M.A.Curtis) Sacc.	1887	North and Central America
	Armillaria mexicana	Elías-Román et al.	2018	Mexico
	Armillaria montagnei	(Singer) Herink	1973	Europe; South America
	Armillaria nabsnona	T.J.Volk & Burds.	1996	Asia; Western North America
	Armillaria novae-zelandiae	(G.Stev.) Boesew.	1973	Australia; New Guinea; New Zealand; South America
	Armillaria omnituens	(Berk.) Sacc.	1887	India
	Armillaria pallidula	Kile & Watling	1988	Australia
	Armillaria paulensis	Capelari	2008	South America
	Armillaria pelliculata	Beeli	1927	Africa
	Armillaria procera	Speg.	1889	South America
	Armillaria puiggarii	Speg.	1889	South America
	Armillaria sinapina	Bérubé & Dessur.	1988	Asia; North America
	Armillaria singula	J.Y.Cha & Igarashi	1994	Japan; North America
	Armillaria socialis	(DC.) Fayod	1889	Eurasia; North America
	Armillaria solidipes, popularly known as Armillaria ostoyae (Note: This species was known as Armillaria ostoyae until a 2008 publication revealed that Charles Horton Peck had described the taxon under a different name in 1900.)	Peck	1900	Eurasia; North America
	Armillaria sparrei	(Singer) Herink	1973	North and South America
	Armillaria tabescens	(Scop.) Emel	1921	Eurasia; North America
	Armillaria tigrensis	(Singer) T.J.Volk & Burds.	1983	South America
	Armillaria umbrinobrunnea	(Singer) Pildain & Rajchenb.	2010	South America
	Armillaria viridiflava	(Singer) T.J.Volk & Burds.	1995	Europe(?); South America
	Armillaria yungensis	(Singer) Herink	1973	South America
