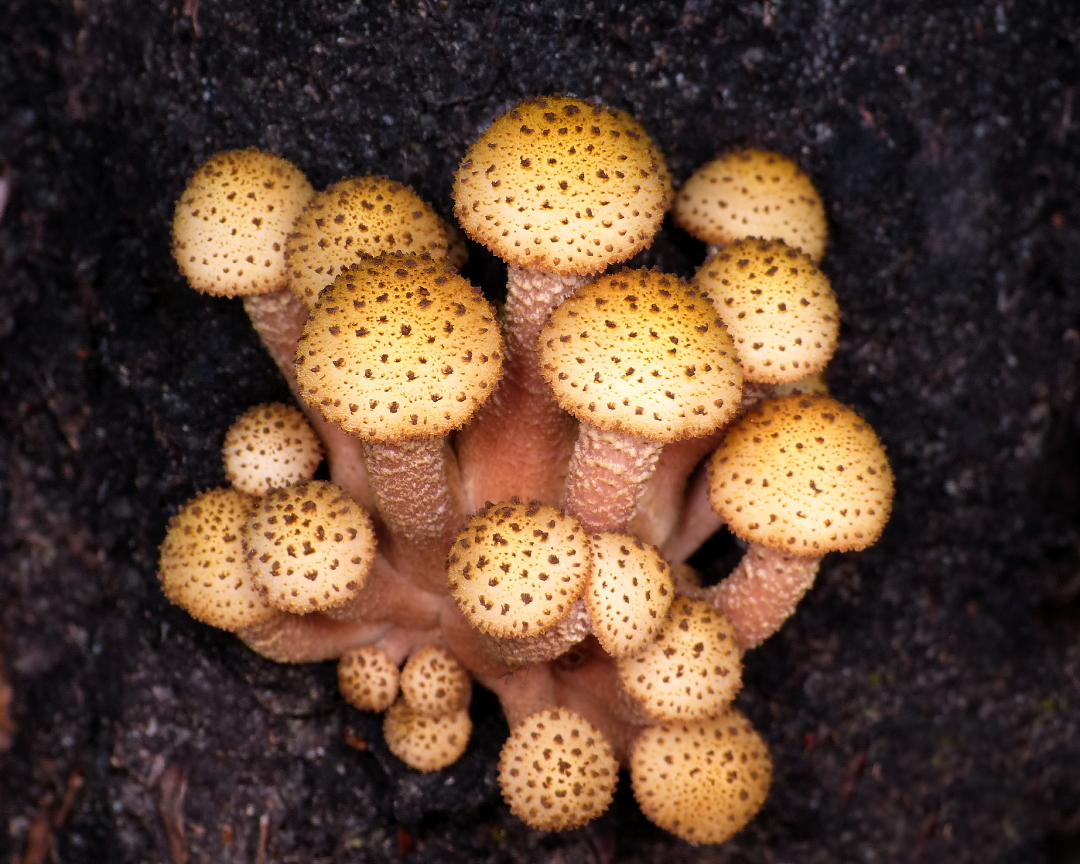

Scientific classification
- Kingdom: Fungi
- Division: Basidiomycota
- Class: Agaricomycetes
- Order: Agaricales
- Family: Physalacriaceae
- Genus: Armillaria
- Species: A. limonea

Binomial name
- Armillaria limonea (G.Stev.) Boesew. (2001)

= Armillaria limonea =

Species of fungus

Armillaria limonea is a species of mushroom in the family Physalacriaceae. This plant pathogen species is one of four Armillaria species that have been identified in New Zealand. The others are A. novae-zelandiae, A. hinnulea, A. aotearoa.

In New Zealand the Te Reo name is harore, the English vernacular name is lemon honeycap, and the diseases caused by Armillaria species are called root rot.

== Description ==
It was originally described as Armillariella limonea by Greta Stevenson: "Pileus 8-13 cm diam., lemon yellow, sprinkled thickly at centre and more sparsely towards the margin with dark brown, tufted scales, dry, convex at first with strongly down-rolled margin, becoming almost plane with a waved edge; flesh firm, white. Gills sinuately decurrent, moderately crowded, creamy white becoming stained pinkish fawn. Stipe 10-15 x 1-1.5 cm, light brown above substantial floccose ring, shading to brown or olive green below, velutinate, sometimes with a few tufted scales, solid, tough, slightly bulbous at base. Spores 7-8 x 5-6.5 μm, non-amyloid, moderately thick-walled; print white".

The pileus of A. limonea can sometimes be bioluminescent.

== Distribution ==
Endemic to New Zealand and found in the North Island and northern South Island.

== Matauranga ==
It is reported that Armillaria limonea has been eaten without adverse reaction although others say that it is bitter and not edible.

== Hosts and disease symptoms ==
The Biota of New Zealand database provides an updated lists the of native and introduced plants associated with or host to A. limonea. Most records of root rot disease attributed to Armillaria species (recognised by the presence of rhizomorphs and fan-like mycelial sheets under bark) do not differentiate between A. limonea and A. novae-zealandiae.

== See also ==
- List of Armillaria species
