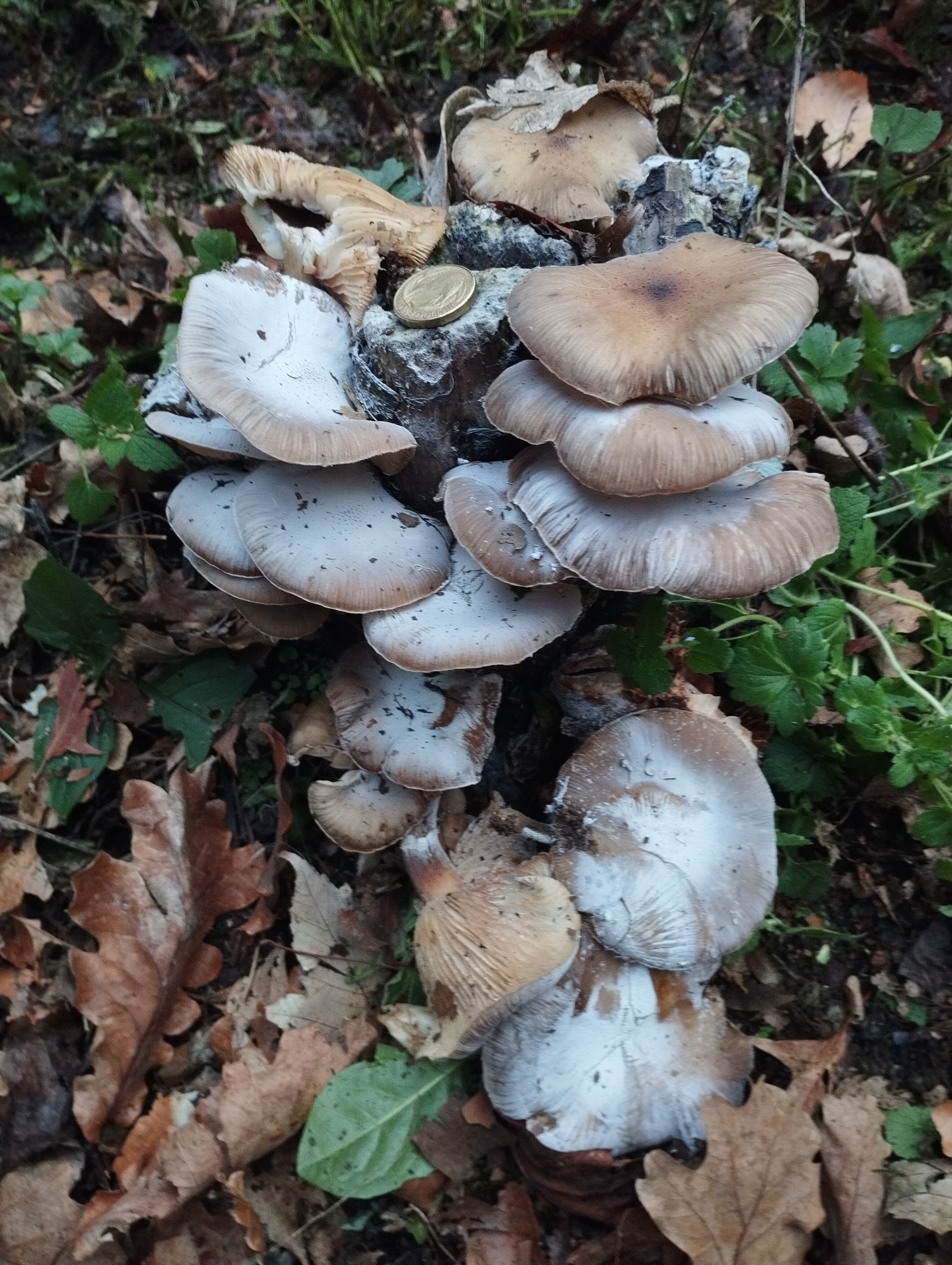
- Armillaria novae-zelandiae fruiting on a tree stump, Wellington, New Zealand

Scientific classification
- Kingdom: Fungi
- Division: Basidiomycota
- Class: Agaricomycetes
- Order: Agaricales
- Family: Physalacriaceae
- Genus: Armillaria
- Species: A. novae-zelandiae

Binomial name
- Armillaria novae-zelandiae (G.Stev.) Boesew. (1977)

Synonyms
- Armillariella novae-zelandiae G.Stev. (1964); Armillaria novae-zelandiae (G.Stev.) Herink (1973)

= Armillaria novae-zelandiae =

Species of fungus

Armillaria novae-zelandiae is a species of mushroom-forming fungus in the family Physalacriaceae. This plant pathogen species is one of four Armillaria species that have been identified in Aotearoa New Zealand, alongside A. limonea, A. hinnulea, A. aotearoa.

In Aotearoa New Zealand the Te Reo name is harore, the English vernacular name is olive honeycap, and the diseases caused by Armillaria species are called root rot.

== Description ==
It was originally described as Armillariella novae-zelandiae by Greta Stevenson: "Pileus 3-8 cm diam., olive-buff to olive-brown, sprinkled at centre with very small dull brown scales, convex at first with a strongly down-rolled margin, becoming plane to shallow concave, moist when fresh with a conspicuously striate margin, drying matt; flesh creamy white. Gills decurrent to a most sinuate, creamy white becoming dull fawn, moderately crowded with many short members. Stipe 4–7 x 0.4–0.8 cm, fawn above evanescent ring, brown to dark purplish brown below, smooth or striate, tough, solid, bases swollen and united. Spores 8–9 x 5.5–6.5μm, non-amyloid rather thick-walled (Fig. 24). Spore print white".

The pileus of A. novae-zelandiae can sometimes be bioluminescent.

== Distribution ==
Armillaria novae-zelandiae is found in Australasia (New Zealand including the Chatham Islands, Tasmania, Eastern Australia, and Papua New Guinea), South America (Argentina and Chile), and Asia (Indonesia, Malaysia and Amami-Oshimi islands of Japan). Isolates from New Zealand and Australia are reciprocally monophyletic but considered conspecific by virtue of their similar basidiocarp morphology, vegetative growth characteristics and sexual compatibility. The South American lineage is sister to the Australasian clade, while isolates from Asia are a basal monophyletic lineage within A. novae-zelandiae.

== Māori cultural importance ==
In Mātauranga Māori, the presence of harore in autumn forests is a signifier of the future, indicating either positive changes (such as a good fishing season) or a time of famine, depending on different regional traditions. Harore is a traditional Māori food source, a tradition which continues to this day, such as by Tūhoe, who continue to collect it as food in Te Urewera. Harore is edible providing it is cooked well before eating. Due to the mushroom disappearing soon after it arrives, this led to the whakataukī (proverb) "he harore rangitahi", or "one-day mushroom", as a phrase to describe transient aspects of life, or as an insult for people who only briefly contribute to work.

== Hosts and disease symptoms ==
The Biota of New Zealand database provides an updated lists the of native and introduced plants associated with or host to A. novae-zelandiae.

Armillaria novae-zelandiae occur naturally in southern beech and broad-leaf podocarp forests. Historically, the clear felling and burning of native forest for conversion to plantation forestry (principally Pinus radiata) did not remove the fungus from the soil where it survived as a wood-decay fungus. When these sites were planted with pines, death of the planted trees occurred particularly around the stumps of the felled native trees that harboured the fungus. The fungus attached the young trees by direct root contact or by fungal rhizomorphs extending from the dead trees roots. The hyphae, mycelium, and rhizomorphs of A. novae-zelandiae can survive on infected tissues in soil for a long time, and in spring when plants start growing, the pathogen can infect new growing tissue.

Spores released from the mushrooms of A. novae-zelandiae are wind-borne can augmenting already infected sites and colonising sites that previously lacked woody vegetation, such as old pasture now planted in trees and other woody plants. Infection occurs in the roots but if the fungus reaches and girdles the root collar, killing the cambium, death of the tree will result.

Horner described the infection process kiwifruit vines (Actinidia chinensis var. deliciosa). The first symptom of infection is a loss of vigour, yellowing of the foliage, and premature leaf fall. Infected main roots develop a wet and pulpy rot, with white mycelial growth beneath the bark, and a distinctive 'mushroomy' smell. Rhizomorphs are found growing from diseased roots. In late stages of infection, the mycelial fan may advance up the lower trunk, causing swelling and cracking of the bark, and bleeding of a dark red exudate. The infected kiwifruit vine usually dies within two years of becoming infected.

== Environment ==
A study of site factors in Pinus radiata plantations found that A. novae-zelandiae prefers sites with a mean annual temperature below 13 °C, with rainfall between 1000 and 1600 mm per annum, and which have been previously forested. A study in Golden Downs Forest showed a topographical effect with 54% infection in gullies but only 6% on steep slopes. However, if soil moisture levels were high then no topographical effect could be observed. A. novae-zelandiae has been shown to survive temperatures up to 41 °C.

Studies have also shown that in pine forests, as pine root systems increase in size and overlap, there is a possibility of disease transfer which allows the spread of infection beyond the area of the original primary source. Also, trees that have been weakened by stresses like defoliation by insects or frost, drought, waterlogging, soil compaction, air pollution, and foliage diseases. The rhizomorphs of the fungus colonise the weakened trees and can colonize an entire root system after severe stresses.

== Management ==
Burning of cleared pine plantation sites initially reduced rhizomorphs in the soil from 41 to 89% to 5–14% but levels soon recovered. Removing and burning stumps reduced the mortality of young trees at age 5 from 52% to 12–21%; however, this is very expensive and suitable for relatively flat terrain only. Chemical treatment of stumps has had some success but is not economical. in 2015, research was being done to see if biological control was another option, by increasing the incidence of other fungi which naturally colonize pine stumps and compete with Armillaria for the substrate, thus forcing the Armillaria species to be confined to smaller and more insignificant segments of the stump.

== See also ==
- List of Armillaria species
