= Armillaria affinis =

Scientific classification
- Domain: Eukaryota
- Kingdom: Fungi
- Division: Basidiomycota
- Class: Agaricomycetes
- Order: Agaricales
- Family: Physalacriaceae
- Genus: Armillaria
- Species: A. affinis

Binomial name
- Armillaria affinis (Singer) T.J.Volk & Burds. (1995)

Synonyms
- Armillariella affinis Singer (1989)

Species of fungus

Armillaria affinis is a species of agaric fungus in the family Physalacriaceae. This species is found in Central America.

== See also ==
- List of Armillaria species
