= Armillaria altimontana =

Scientific classification
- Domain: Eukaryota
- Kingdom: Fungi
- Division: Basidiomycota
- Class: Agaricomycetes
- Order: Agaricales
- Family: Physalacriaceae
- Genus: Armillaria
- Species: A. altimontana

Binomial name
- Armillaria altimontana Brazee, B.Ortiz, Banik & D.L.Lindner (2012)

Species of fungus

Armillaria altimontana is a species of agaric fungus in the family Physalacriaceae. The species, found in the Pacific Northwest region of North America, was officially described as new to science in 2012. It was previously known as North American biological species (NABS) X. It grows in high-elevation mesic habitats in dry coniferous forests. This species has been found on hardwoods and conifers and is associated most commonly with fir-dominated forest types in southern British Columbia, Washington, Oregon, Idaho and northern California.

A. Altimontana competes directly with A. solidipes, and evidence suggests it's beneficial and can increase tree survival.

== See also ==
- List of Armillaria species
