= Armillaria yungensis =

Scientific classification
- Domain: Eukaryota
- Kingdom: Fungi
- Division: Basidiomycota
- Class: Agaricomycetes
- Order: Agaricales
- Family: Physalacriaceae
- Genus: Armillaria
- Species: A. yungensis

Binomial name
- Armillaria yungensis (Singer) Herink (1973)

Synonyms
- Armillariella yungensis Singer (1970)

Species of fungus

Armillaria yungensis is a species of agaric fungus in the family Physalacriaceae. This species is found in South America.

== See also ==
- List of Armillaria species
