= Kari Korhonen (biologist) =

Finnish plant pathologist (born 1943)

Kari Korhonen (born July 24, 1943 in Sotkamo) is a Finnish mycologist and forest pathologist, known for his studies of fungi causing root rot.

Korhonen graduated as a biologist from the University of Helsinki in 1968. He made his career as a researcher at the Finnish Forest Research Institute in Helsinki, beginning in 1973. From the start his research concentrated on the forest pathogen fungi then known as Heterobasidion annosum and Armillaria mellea. During his career over 40 years he collected more than 4000 isolates of these species in Scandinavia, Germany, Italy, Greece, USA, Canada, Estonia, Belarus, Siberia and China.

Initially, following Veikko Hintikka's discovery of a technique to distinguish between Armillaria species by growing them together as single spore isolates on petri dishes and observing changes in the morphology of the cultures, Korhonen showed in 1978 that the European Armillaria mellea species complex could be separated into five reproductively isolated species. Similarly he studied the sexual incompatibility of bipolar systems also in Heterobasidion. As result of these studies the genus Heterobasidion was divided into three species with high tree-host specificity, while Armillaria has by now been divided into more than 40 species. These pioneering, extraordinary breakthroughs were achieved back in the 1970s, decades before the dawn of modern DNA amplification and sequencing technologies.

Korhonen has published more than 50 scientific papers in international journals and edited books, almost all dealing with root rot fungi and their antagonists. For his pioneering work, he received an honorary doctorate from the University of Monaco of Bavaria in 1992. Fungal species named in honor of Korhonen include Armillaria korhonenii (Liu 2024), Entoloma korhonenii (Noordeloos 2004) and Hygrophorus korhonenii (Harmaja 1985). He also developed and selected the first and most widely used biological control system for Heterobasidion using the antagonistic fungus Phlebiopsis gigantea. The system is patented as Rotstop® biofungicide for biological stump treatment (Vasiliauskas 2005)..

== Species described ==
- Armillaria borealis Marxm. & Korhonen (1982)
- Heterobasidion abietinum Niemelä & Korhonen (1998)
- Heterobasidion amyloideum Y.C.Dai, Jia J.Chen & Korhonen (2014)
- Heterobasidion australe Y.C.Dai & Korhonen (2009)
- Heterobasidion linzhiense Y.C.Dai & Korhonen (2007)
- Heterobasidion parviporum Niemelä & Korhonen (1998)
- Heterobasidion tibeticum Y.C.Dai, Jia J.Chen & Korhonen (2014)
- Lactarius hysginoides Korhonen & T.Ulvinen (1985)
