= Armillaria heimii =

Scientific classification
- Domain: Eukaryota
- Kingdom: Fungi
- Division: Basidiomycota
- Class: Agaricomycetes
- Order: Agaricales
- Family: Physalacriaceae
- Genus: Armillaria
- Species: A. heimii

Binomial name
- Armillaria heimii Pegler (1977)

Synonyms
- Clitocybe elegans R.Heim (1963); Armillariella elegans (R.Heim) J.B.Taylor, J.E.Hawkins & McLaren (1974)

Species of fungus

Armillaria heimii is a species of fungus in the family Physalacriaceae that is found in East Africa. It causes root rot in tea trees. The fungus was originally described as Clitocybe elegans by Roger Heim in 1963. David Pegler transferred it to the genus Armillaria in 1977.

== See also ==
- List of Armillaria species
- List of tea diseases
