= Armillaria apalosclera =

Scientific classification
- Domain: Eukaryota
- Kingdom: Fungi
- Division: Basidiomycota
- Class: Agaricomycetes
- Order: Agaricales
- Family: Physalacriaceae
- Genus: Armillaria
- Species: A. apalosclera

Binomial name
- Armillaria apalosclera (Berk.) A. Chandra & Watling

Species of fungus

Armillaria apalosclera is a species of mushroom in the family Physalacriaceae. This species is found in Asia.

== See also ==
- List of Armillaria species
