= Armillaria fellea =

Scientific classification
- Domain: Eukaryota
- Kingdom: Fungi
- Division: Basidiomycota
- Class: Agaricomycetes
- Order: Agaricales
- Family: Physalacriaceae
- Genus: Armillaria
- Species: A. fellea

Binomial name
- Armillaria fellea (Hongo) Kile & Watling

Species of fungus

Armillaria fellea is a species of mushroom in the family Physalacriaceae. This species is found in Australia.

== See also ==
- List of Armillaria species
