= Armillaria pelliculata =

Scientific classification
- Domain: Eukaryota
- Kingdom: Fungi
- Division: Basidiomycota
- Class: Agaricomycetes
- Order: Agaricales
- Family: Physalacriaceae
- Genus: Armillaria
- Species: A. pelliculata

Binomial name
- Armillaria pelliculata Beeli (1927)

Synonyms
- Lactarius pelliculatus (Beeli) Buyck (1989); Lactarius pelliculatus f. pelliculatus (Beeli) Buyck (1989); Lactifluus pelliculatus (Beeli) Buyck (2011)

Species of fungus

Armillaria pelliculata is a species of agaric fungus in the family Physalacriaceae. This species is found in Africa.

== See also ==
- List of Armillaria species
