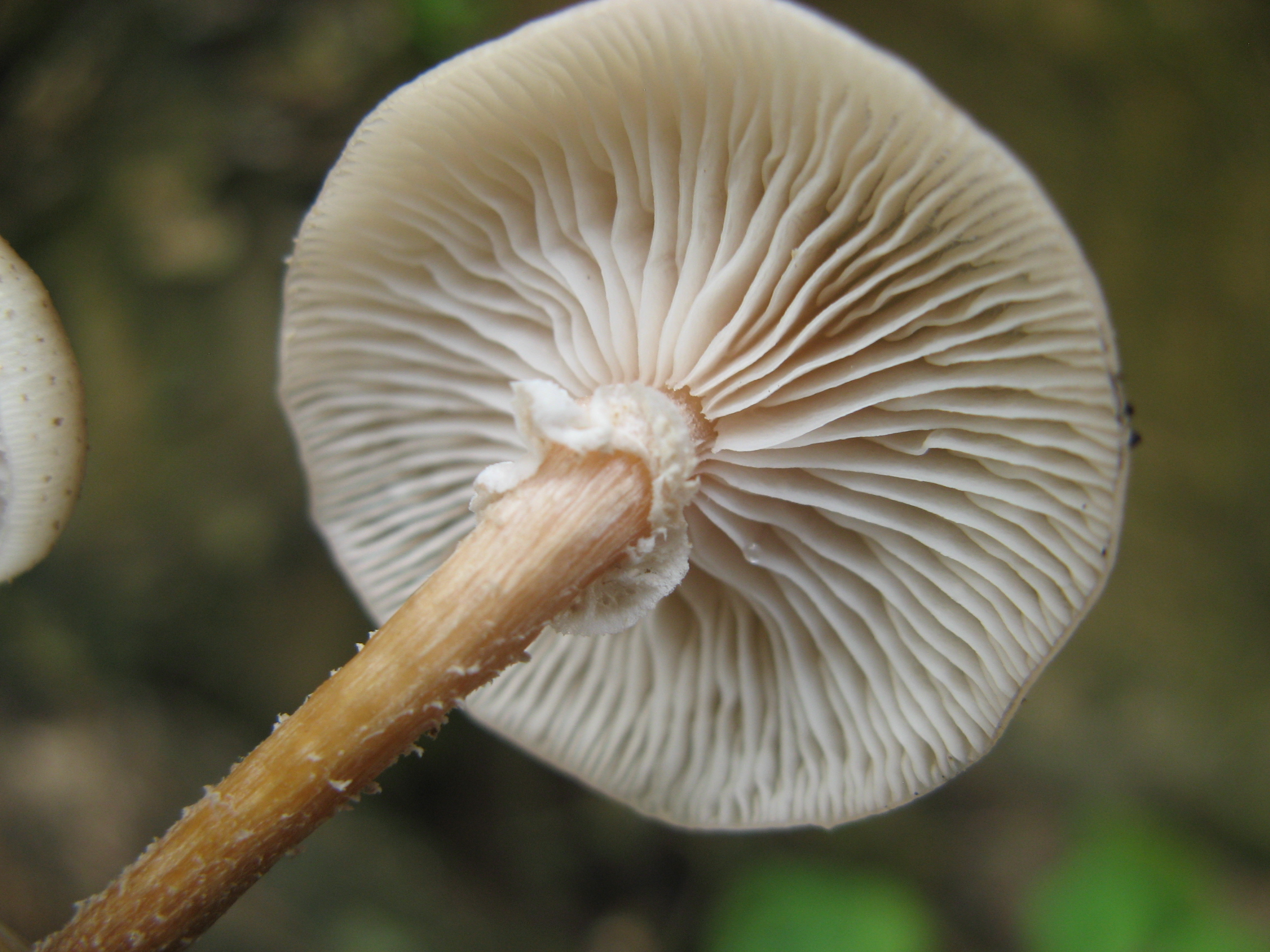
- In Costa Rica

Scientific classification
- Domain: Eukaryota
- Kingdom: Fungi
- Division: Basidiomycota
- Class: Agaricomycetes
- Order: Agaricales
- Family: Physalacriaceae
- Genus: Armillaria
- Species: A. puiggarii

Binomial name
- Armillaria puiggarii Speg. (1889)

Synonyms
- Armillariella puiggarii (Speg.) Singer (1951)

= Armillaria puiggarii =

Species of fungus

Armillaria puiggarii is a species of agaric fungus in the family Physalacriaceae. This species is found in Central and South America.

== See also ==
- List of Armillaria species
