= Armillaria camerunensis =

Scientific classification
- Domain: Eukaryota
- Kingdom: Fungi
- Division: Basidiomycota
- Class: Agaricomycetes
- Order: Agaricales
- Family: Physalacriaceae
- Genus: Armillaria
- Species: A. camerunensis

Binomial name
- Armillaria camerunensis (Henn.) Courtec. (1995)

Synonyms
- Armillaria mellea var. camerunensis Henn. (1895)

Species of fungus

Armillaria camerunensis is a species of agaric fungus in the family Physalacriaceae. This species is found in Africa.

== See also ==
- List of Armillaria species
