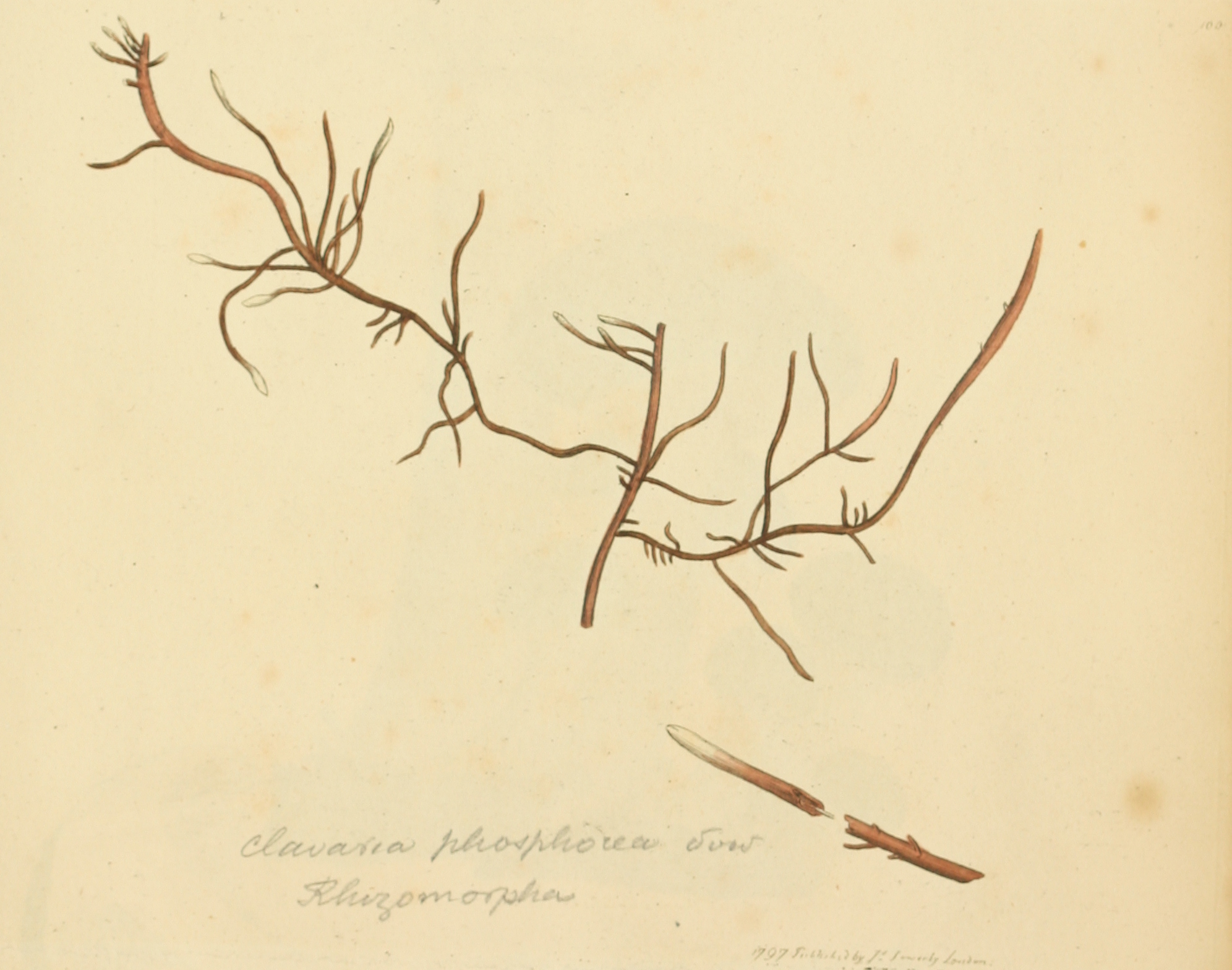
- Clavaria phosphorea Sow. (synonym of R. subcorticalis)

Scientific classification
- Kingdom: Fungi
- Division: incertae sedis
- Class: incertae sedis
- Order: incertae sedis
- Family: incertae sedis
- Genus: Rhizomorpha
- Species: R. subcorticalis

Binomial name
- Rhizomorpha subcorticalis P. Micheli ex Pers., (1801)

= Rhizomorpha subcorticalis =

Species of fungi

Rhizomorpha subcorticalis is a species name that has been used to characterize certain fungal plant pathogen observations where the pathogen is evident only through mycelial cords ("rhizomorphs"). The species in question very likely also produces reproductive structures which would allow it to be situated in the normal taxonomic tree, especially if DNA analysis is available. A name like R. subcorticalis should only be used where such identification is impossible.

== History ==
The species name was first validly published by Persoon in 1801 with acknowledgement of an earlier description by P. Micheli, describing the fungus as consisting of brownish-black branches and being found between bark and heartwood (which is the meaning of "subcorticalis"). Rhizomorpha fragilis is listed as a synonym, indicating that the "real" species may have been Armillaria mellea ("Honey Fungus"). Another given synonym is Clavaria phosphorea which was described in 1797 by James Sowerby - the epithet phosphorea indicates that it glows in the dark, which is also true of Armillaria rhizomorphs. Someone has annotated Sowerby's plate illustrating the species with the word Rhizomorpha.

The name has been used for a crown and root rot disease of strawberry and avocado, where according to the American Phytopathological Society the fungus in question is indeed actually Armillaria mellea.

In 1871 in his book on diseases of forest trees, Robert Hartig mentioned R. subcorticalis as well as R. fragilis contrasting them as different species, the former being thinner and softer and having little tissue in the interior of the strands. So here R. subcorticalis must represent something other than Armillaria mellea.
