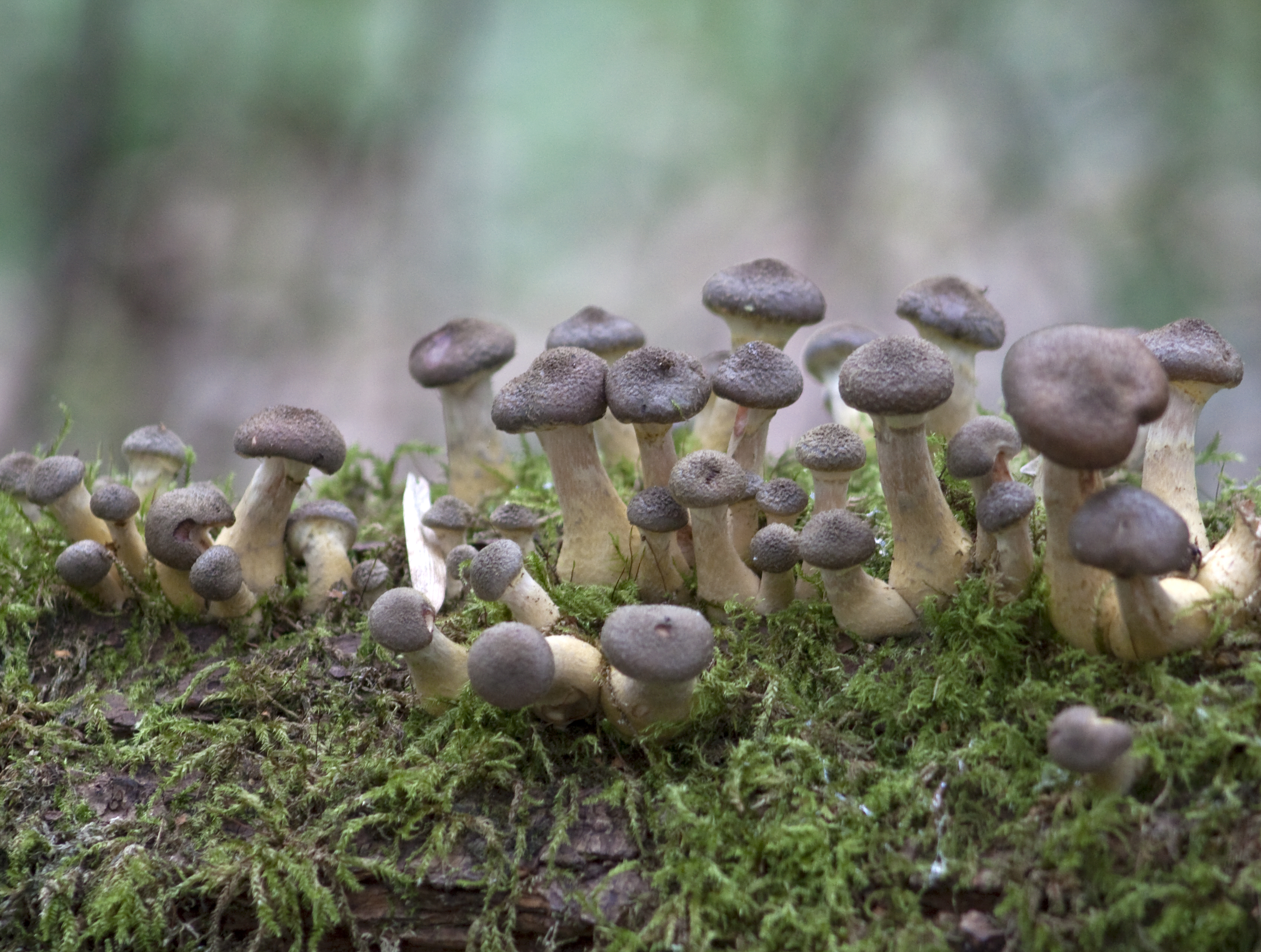

Scientific classification
- Domain: Eukaryota
- Kingdom: Fungi
- Division: Basidiomycota
- Class: Agaricomycetes
- Order: Agaricales
- Family: Physalacriaceae
- Genus: Armillaria
- Species: A. cepistipes

Binomial name
- Armillaria cepistipes Velen. (1920)

Synonyms
- European Biological Species (EBS) B; North American Biological Species (NABS) XI; Armillaria bulbosa (Barla) Marxmuller 1982 non Romagn.

= Armillaria cepistipes =

Species of fungus

Armillaria cepistipes is a common wood-rotting basidiomycete fungus found in most forests in Central Europe. Armillaria cepistipes is a species of mushroom in the family Physalacriaceae. This is a weakly plant pathogenic species that is typically found growing at the base of deciduous trees that have previously been stressed by another pathogen. The mycelium of the fungus is bioluminescent.

== See also ==
- List of Armillaria species
