= Armillaria omnituens =

Scientific classification
- Domain: Eukaryota
- Kingdom: Fungi
- Division: Basidiomycota
- Class: Agaricomycetes
- Order: Agaricales
- Family: Physalacriaceae
- Genus: Armillaria
- Species: A. omnituens

Binomial name
- Armillaria omnituens (Berk.) Sacc.

Synonyms
- Agaricus omnituens Berk. (1850); Armillariella omnituens (Berk.) Singer (1962)

Species of fungus

Armillaria omnituens is a species of mushroom in the family Physalacriaceae. This species is found in Asia.

== See also ==
- List of Armillaria species
