= Armillaria jezoensis =

Scientific classification
- Domain: Eukaryota
- Kingdom: Fungi
- Division: Basidiomycota
- Class: Agaricomycetes
- Order: Agaricales
- Family: Physalacriaceae
- Genus: Armillaria
- Species: A. jezoensis

Binomial name
- Armillaria jezoensis J.Y.Cha & Igarashi (1994)

Species of fungus

Armillaria jezoensis is a species of mushroom in the family Physalacriaceae. Found in Japan, it was described as new to science in 1994.

== See also ==
- List of Armillaria species
