= Armillaria singula =

Scientific classification
- Domain: Eukaryota
- Kingdom: Fungi
- Division: Basidiomycota
- Class: Agaricomycetes
- Order: Agaricales
- Family: Physalacriaceae
- Genus: Armillaria
- Species: A. singula

Binomial name
- Armillaria singula J.Y.Cha & Igarashi (1988)

Species of fungus

Armillaria singula is a species of agaric fungus in the family Physalacriaceae. It is found in Asia.

== See also ==
- List of Armillaria species
