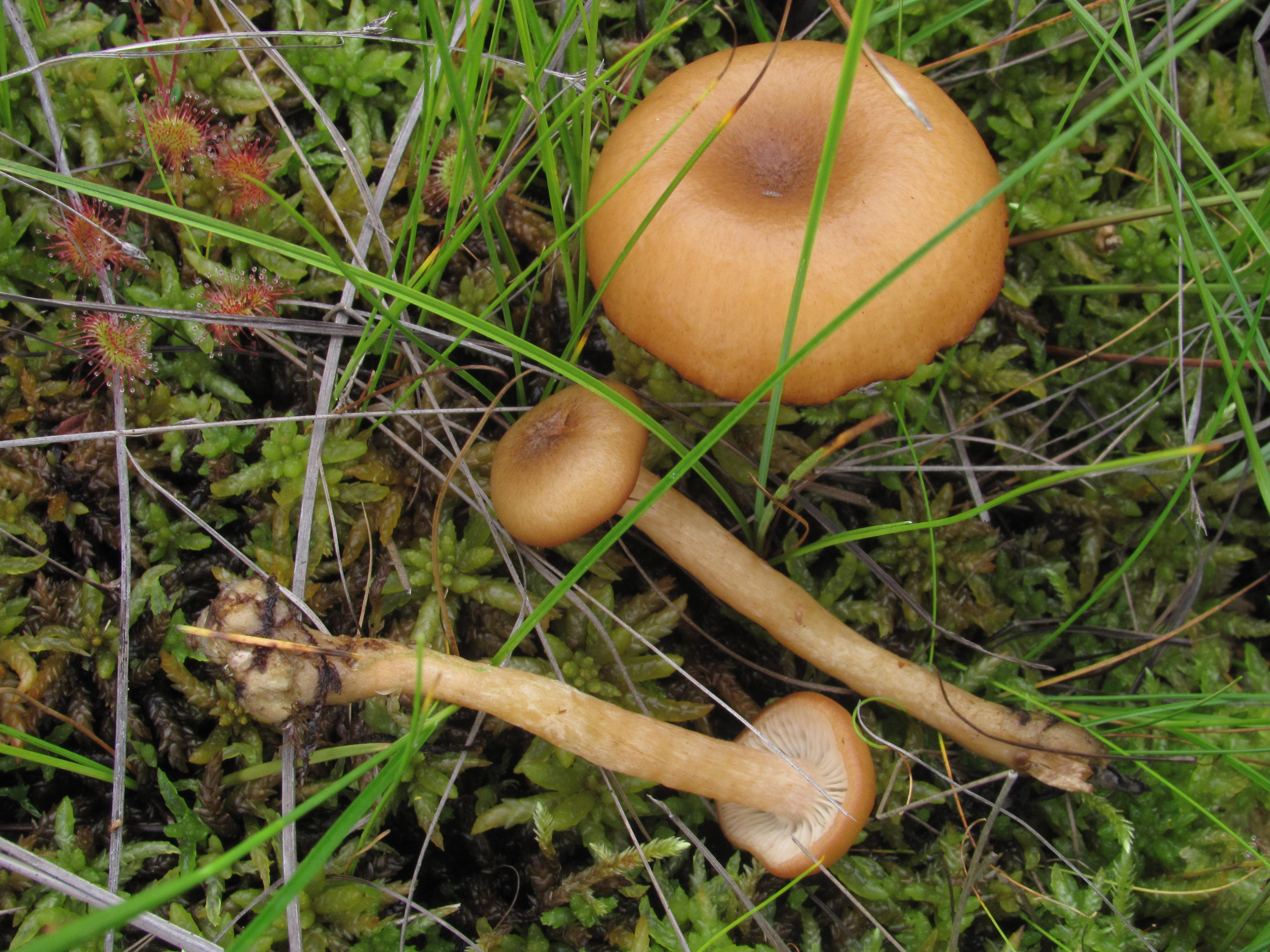

Conservation status
- Near Threatened (IUCN 3.1)

Scientific classification
- Domain: Eukaryota
- Kingdom: Fungi
- Division: Basidiomycota
- Class: Agaricomycetes
- Order: Agaricales
- Family: Physalacriaceae
- Genus: Armillaria
- Species: A. ectypa

Binomial name
- Armillaria ectypa (Fr.) Lamoure (1965)

Synonyms
- Agaricus ectypus Fr. (1821); Clitocybe ectypa (Fr.) Gillet (1874); Camarophyllus ectypus (Fr.) P.Karst. (1879); Omphalia ectypa (Fr.) Quél. (1886); Armillariella ectypa (Fr.) Singer (1943)

= Armillaria ectypa =

Species of fungus

Armillaria ectypa is a species of mushroom in the family Physalacriaceae. Commonly known as the marsh honey fungus, it prefers growing in sphagnum bogs with mosses. It is classified as endangered in Great Britain, and is protected under the Wildlife and Countryside Act 1981; it is also on the provisional European red data list. A. ectypa has been observed to have both bioluminescent mycelium and fruitbodies (mainly the gills).

== Description ==
The cap can grow to 10 cm (4 in) in diameter, and is convex at first becoming flattened with age, sometimes developing a depressed centre. The cap has a slightly curved margin and is often striate with the gills visible through its thin structure. The centre is dark brown and scaly. The rest of the cap is yellowish-brown to brown, paler when it is dry and darker when it is moist. The gills are rather narrow and decurrent, whitish at first, becoming cream, buff or pinkish. The stem is up to 10 cm (4 in) tall, cylindrical and slightly swollen at the base. It is the same colour as the cap. There are no mycelial cords at the base of the stem. The spore print is white.

== Distribution and habitat ==
The marsh honey fungus has a boreal and montane Eurasian distribution. In Europe, it has been recorded in Austria, Switzerland, the Czech Republic, Denmark, Sweden, Finland, France, Germany, Poland, the British Isles, the Netherlands, Russia and Slovakia. In Asia, it has been recorded in China, Japan and Turkey. Its typical habitat is in waterlogged habitats, in raised bogs, peat mires and alkaline fens, among Sphagnum mosses, sedges, cottongrass and reeds. It is uncommon or rare across the whole of its range. It grows on the Garron Plateau in County Antrim in Northern Ireland, this being one of the only four known sites in the British Isles.

== See also ==
- List of Armillaria species
