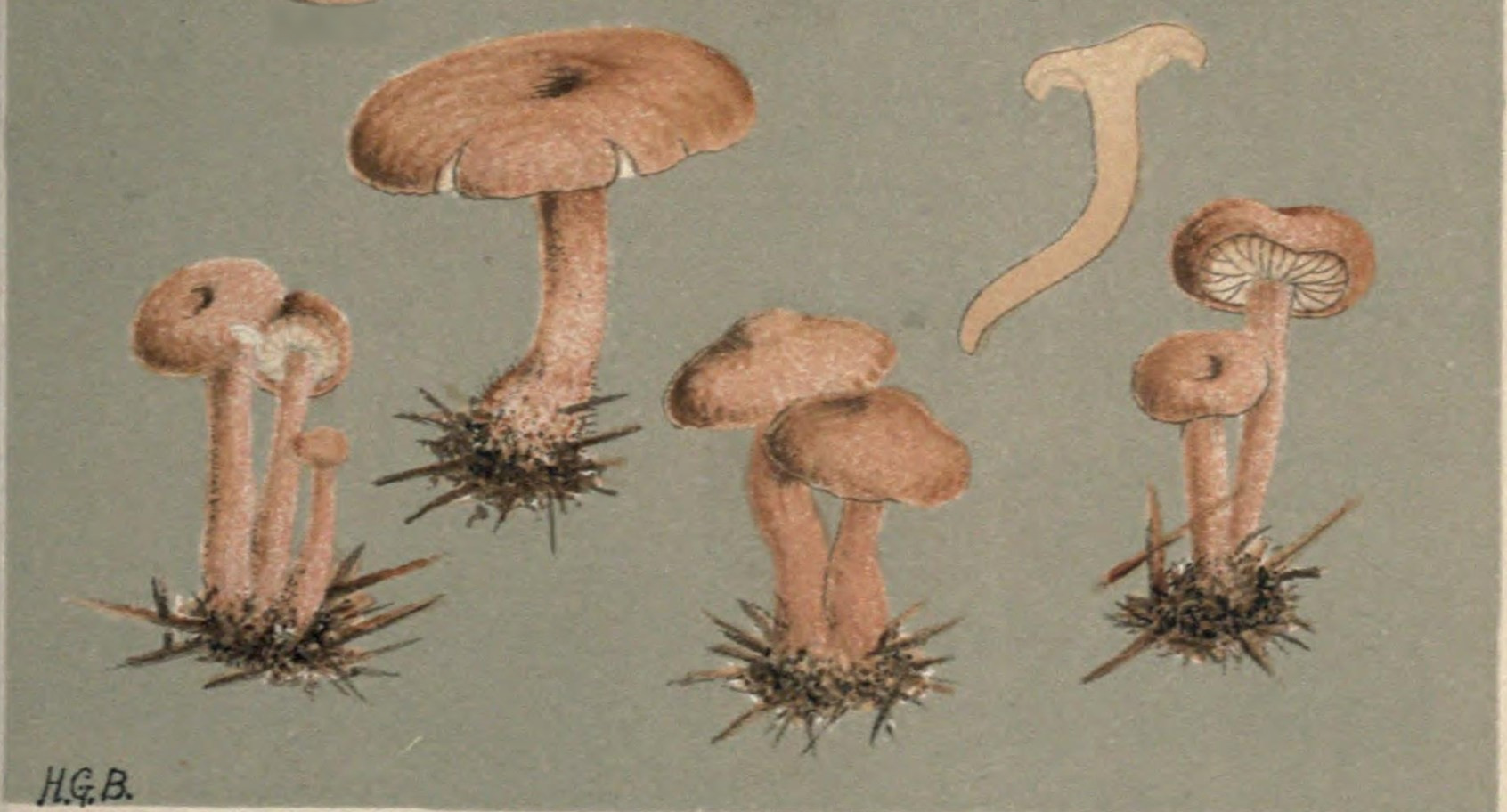

Scientific classification
- Domain: Eukaryota
- Kingdom: Fungi
- Division: Basidiomycota
- Class: Agaricomycetes
- Order: Agaricales
- Family: Physalacriaceae
- Genus: Armillaria
- Species: A. socialis

Binomial name
- Armillaria socialis (DC.) Fayod (1889)

Synonyms
- Agaricus socialis DC. (1815); Clitocybe socialis (DC.) Gillet (1874); Armillaria socialis (DC.) Herink (1973)

= Armillaria socialis =

Species of fungus

Armillaria socialis is a species of fungus in the family Physalacriaceae. It is a plant pathogen. Originally described by Augustin Pyramus de Candolle in 1815, it was transferred to Armillaria by Victor Fayod in 1889. It is found in Asia, Europe, and North America.

== See also ==
- List of Armillaria species
