= Armillaria viridiflava =

Scientific classification
- Domain: Eukaryota
- Kingdom: Fungi
- Division: Basidiomycota
- Class: Agaricomycetes
- Order: Agaricales
- Family: Physalacriaceae
- Genus: Armillaria
- Species: A. viridiflava

Binomial name
- Armillaria viridiflava (Singer) T.J.Volk & Burds. (1995)

Synonyms
- Armillariella viridiflava Singer (1989)

Species of fungus

Armillaria viridiflava is a species of agaric fungus in the family Physalacriaceae. This species is found in South America.

== See also ==
- List of Armillaria species
