= Armillaria melleorubens =

Scientific classification
- Domain: Eukaryota
- Kingdom: Fungi
- Division: Basidiomycota
- Class: Agaricomycetes
- Order: Agaricales
- Family: Physalacriaceae
- Genus: Armillaria
- Species: A. melleorubens

Binomial name
- Armillaria melleorubens (Berk. & M.A. Curtis) Sacc.

Species of fungus

Armillaria melleorubens is a species of mushroom in the family Physalacriaceae. This species is found in Central America.

== See also ==
- List of Armillaria species
