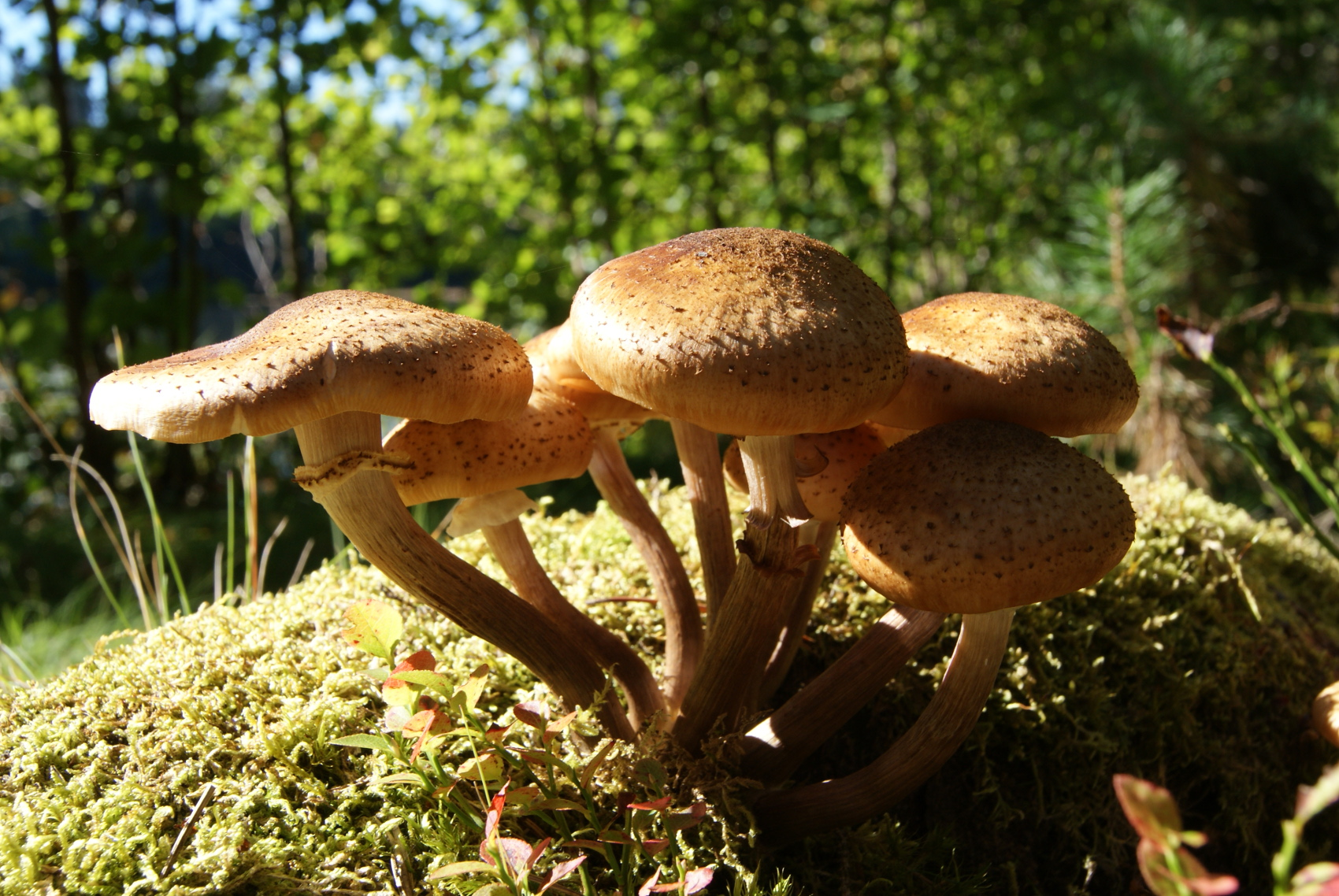

Scientific classification
- Domain: Eukaryota
- Kingdom: Fungi
- Division: Basidiomycota
- Class: Agaricomycetes
- Order: Agaricales
- Family: Physalacriaceae
- Genus: Armillaria
- Species: A. borealis

Binomial name
- Armillaria borealis Marxm. & Korhonen, 1982

= Armillaria borealis =

Species of fungus

Armillaria borealis is a species of mushroom in the family Physalacriaceae. Phylogenetic analysis of ribosomal DNA has shown that within the genus Armillaria, this species is most closely related to A. solidipes and A. gemina.
