= Armillaria sparrei =

Scientific classification
- Domain: Eukaryota
- Kingdom: Fungi
- Division: Basidiomycota
- Class: Agaricomycetes
- Order: Agaricales
- Family: Physalacriaceae
- Genus: Armillaria
- Species: A. sparrei

Binomial name
- Armillaria sparrei (Singer) Herink

Species of fungus

Armillaria sparrei is a species of mushroom in the family Physalacriaceae.

== See also ==
- List of Armillaria species
