= Armillaria umbrinobrunnea =

Scientific classification
- Domain: Eukaryota
- Kingdom: Fungi
- Division: Basidiomycota
- Class: Agaricomycetes
- Order: Agaricales
- Family: Physalacriaceae
- Genus: Armillaria
- Species: A. umbrinobrunnea

Binomial name
- Armillaria umbrinobrunnea (Singer) Pildain & Rajchenb.

Synonyms
- Armillariella montagnei var. umbrinobrunnea Singer (1956)

Species of fungus

Armillaria umbrinobrunnea is a species of mushroom in the family Physalacriaceae. This species is found in South America. The beige to light brown caps of the mushroom are between 15 and 50 mm (0.6 and 2.0 in) in diameter, and densely covered in small scales. The species was originally collected in 1952 by Rolf Singer in Argentina, and named as the variety Armillariella montagnei var. umbrinobrunnea.

== See also ==
- List of Armillaria species
