= Vasiliauskas =

Vasiliauskas is the masculine form of a Lithuanian family name. {Polish counterpart: Wasilewski, Russian: Vasilevsky. Its feminine forms are: Vasiliauskienė (married woman or widow) and Vasiliauskaitė (unmarried woman).

The surname may refer to:

- Kazimieras Vasiliauskas (1922–2001), monsignor
- Kazim Vasiliauskas, Lithuanian racing driver
- Povilas Vasiliauskas, politician
- Justinas Vasiliauskas, rugby player, Lithuanian national team
- Augustinas Vasiliauskas, musician, Recipient of the Lithuanian National Prize
- Nida Vasiliauskaitė, Lithuanian philosopher and publicist
- Šarūnas Vasiliauskas, Lithuanian basketball player
