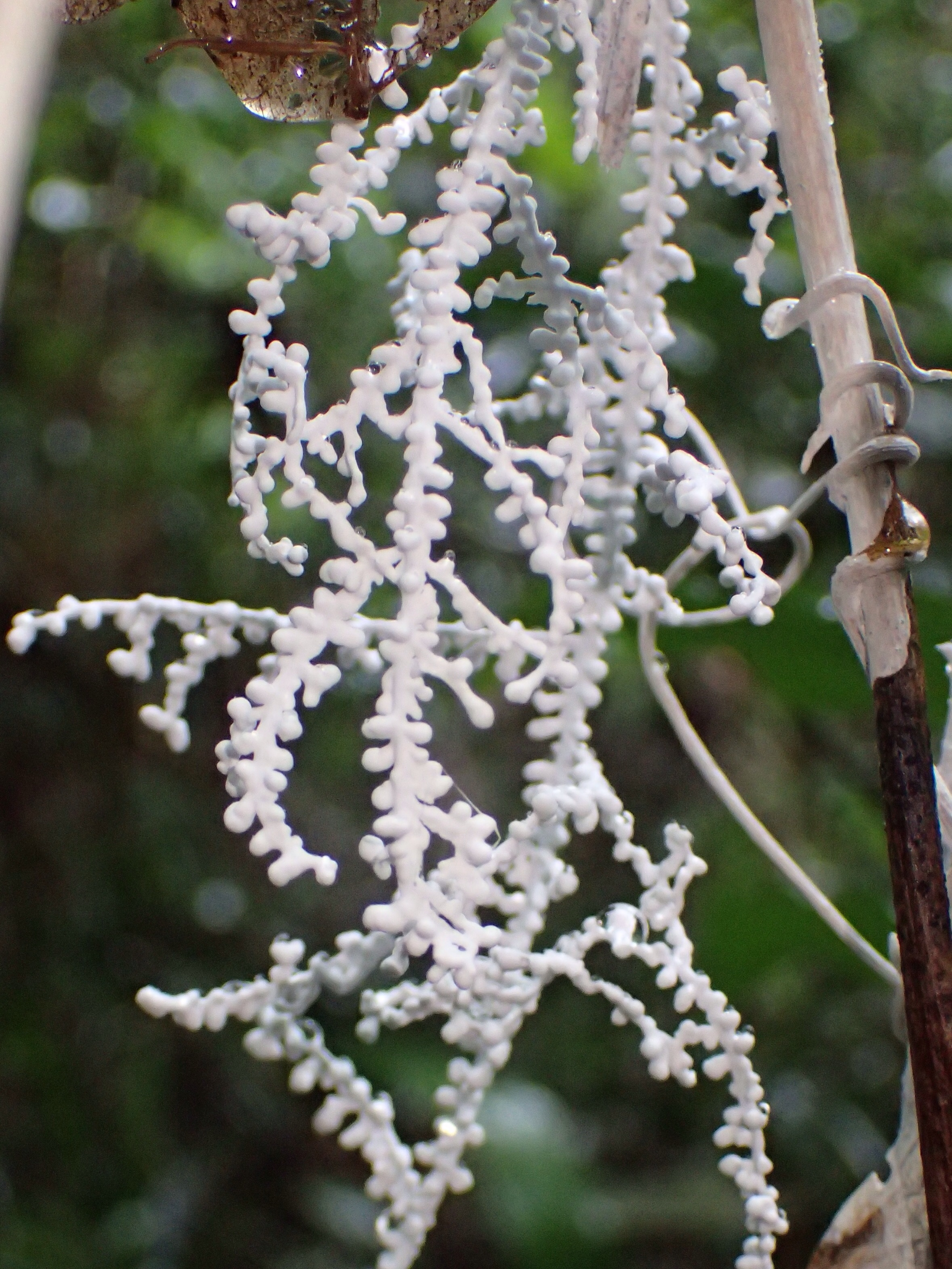
- R. corynephora (= Brunneocorticium corynecarpon)

Scientific classification
- Kingdom: Fungi
- Division: incertae sedis
- Class: incertae sedis
- Order: incertae sedis
- Family: incertae sedis
- Genus: Rhizomorpha Roth (1791)

= Rhizomorpha =

Genus of fungi

Rhizomorpha is a genus of fungi that was created for species known only by their mycelial cords ("rhizomorphs") and so impossible to classify within the normal taxonomic system, which is based on reproductive structures.

== Origin and naming ==
Mycelial cords, or rhizomorphs, are long strands sent out by some fungi to colonize new space and absorb nutrients. They typically run along the ground or under bark, but may also hang in the air. They are complex structures, big enough to be seen with the naked eye, and they should not be confused with the microscopic thread-like cells (hyphae) of which they are composed. Fungi are generally classified according to their sexual or asexual spore-bearing organs (including fruiting bodies where present), but where only sterile rhizomorphs were available, such species were put into genus Rhizomorpha even if they were not genetically related.

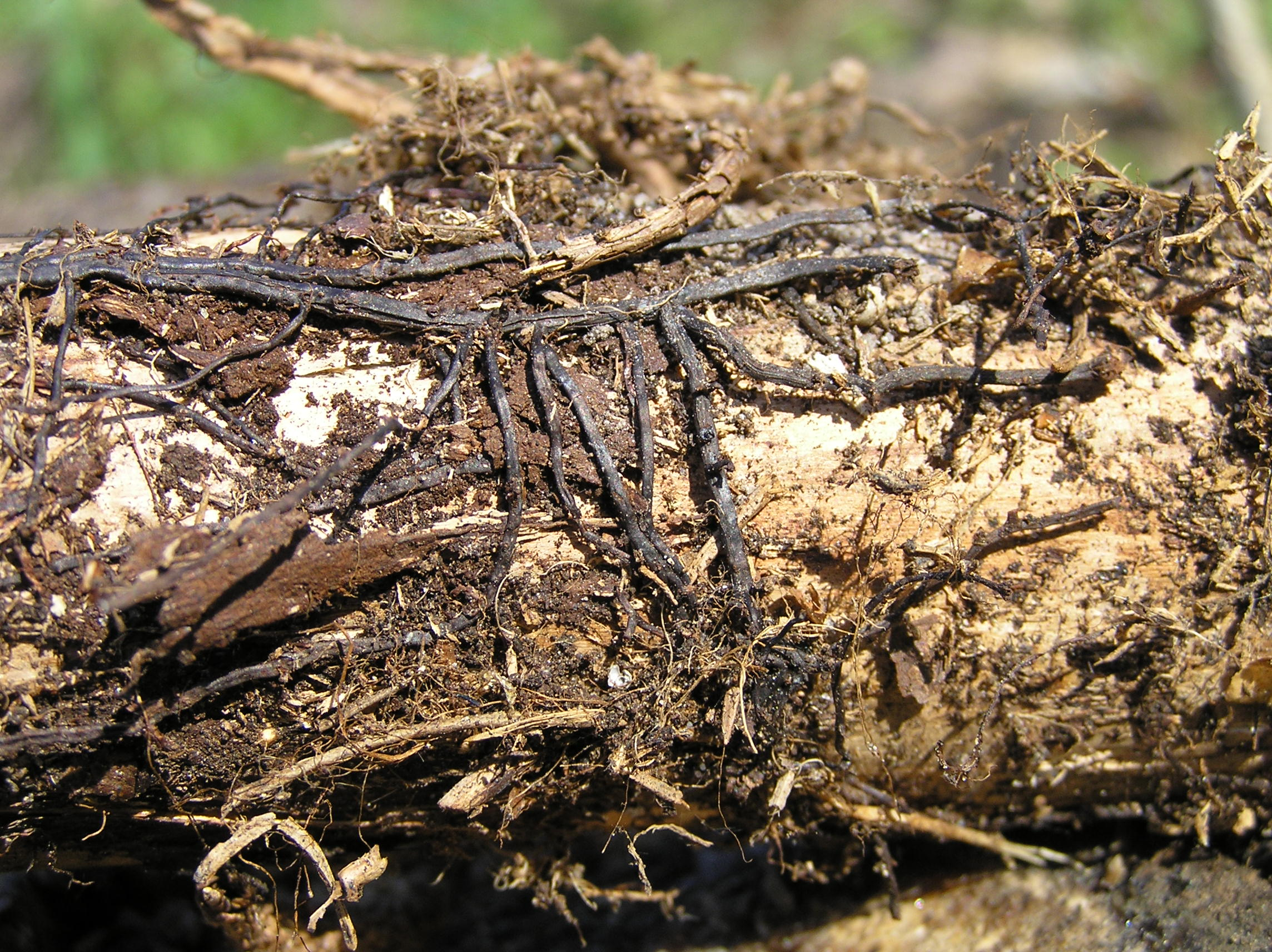
Rhizomorphs of Armillaria mellea

The genus was created in 1791 by Albrecht Wilhelm Roth for an observation of material in the form of mycelial cords, which he assigned to species Rhizomorpha fragilis. Later the name Rhizomorpha was sanctioned (given guaranteed priority) by Elias Magnus Fries.

But the cords of R. fragilis were subsequently determined actually to belong to the well-known mushroom taxon Armillaria mellea (Honey Fungus). The genus Armillaria was not defined until 1857 and therefore according to the precedence rules of botanical and mycological nomenclature, the name Armillaria is illegitimate and needs to be replaced everywhere by Rhizomorpha. To avoid this inconvenience, in a 2021 paper covering numerous similar cases, Stalpers et al. have proposed that the name Armillaria should be protected. That decision remains to be taken by the Nomenclature Committee for Fungi and ultimately by an International Botanical Congress.

With DNA analysis it should nowadays always be possible to assign observed material to genera in the normal taxonomic tree, and those genera should be used instead of Rhizomorpha. However it is still a legitimate genus name.

== Example species ==
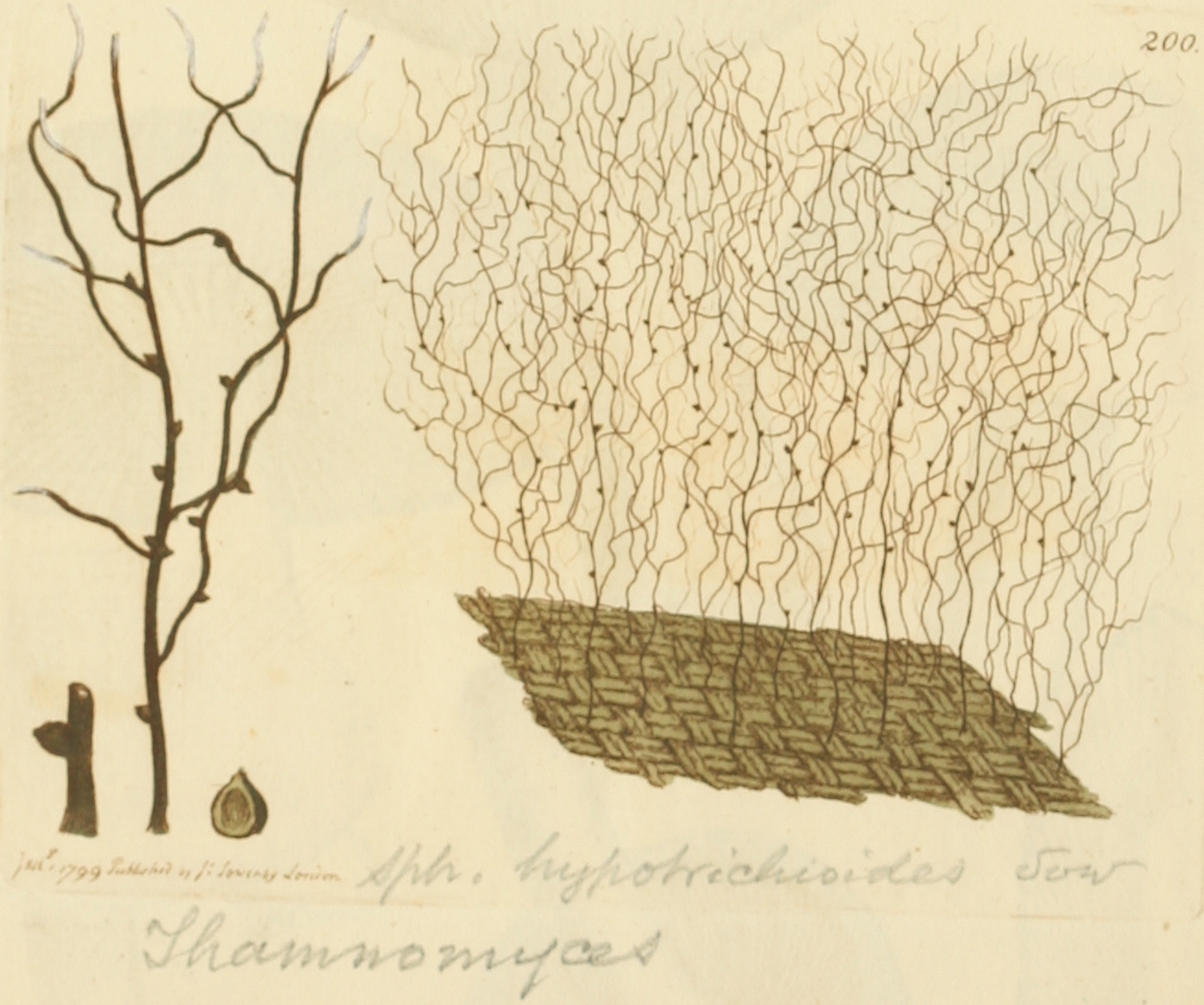
Xylaria hippotrichoides: original illustration by Sowerby

In 1799 James Sowerby published a mycelial cord species under the name Sphaeria hypotrichoides, which was then renamed to Rhizomorpha hippotrichoides by Fries in 1849 and later to Xylaria hippotrichoides by Pier Andrea Saccardo in 1882 when asci and spores had been observed. This species has the English vernacular name "Horsehair Candlesnuff".

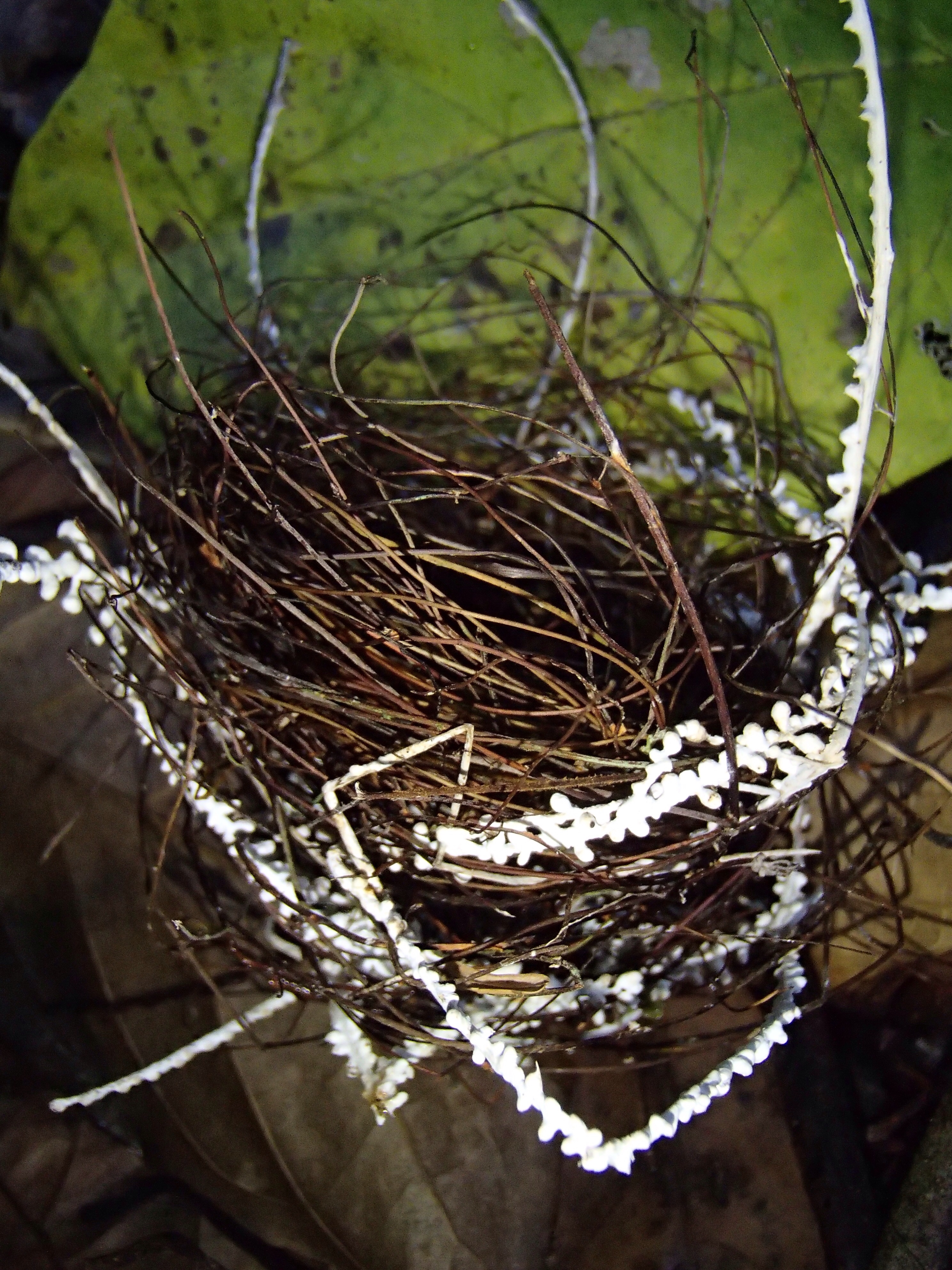
Peruvian nest incorporating Brunneocorticium corynecarpon

The name Rhizomorpha should now be avoided, but at the time of writing there is still at least one species which is found only in the form of mycelial cords and for which no spore-bearing structures have been observed. This species is Brunneocorticium corynecarpon, which was originally described by Gustav Kunze in 1828 as Rhizomorpha corynecarpos. It consists of broad white aerial rhizomorphs which have frequent short branches and it occurs in the tropical forest canopy in Suriname and some other South American countries. It causes significant damage to trees and it is sometimes used by birds as nesting material. In 2018, molecular studies led it to be assigned to genus Brunneocorticium within the Marasmiaceae, a family which consists mainly of mushroom-forming genera. Other members of the Marasmiaceae, such as Marasmius crinis-equi ("horse hair fungus") also have aerial rhizomorphs.

Numerous other species names have been assigned under genus Rhizomorpha, and the Mycobank database currently lists 96 such names.
