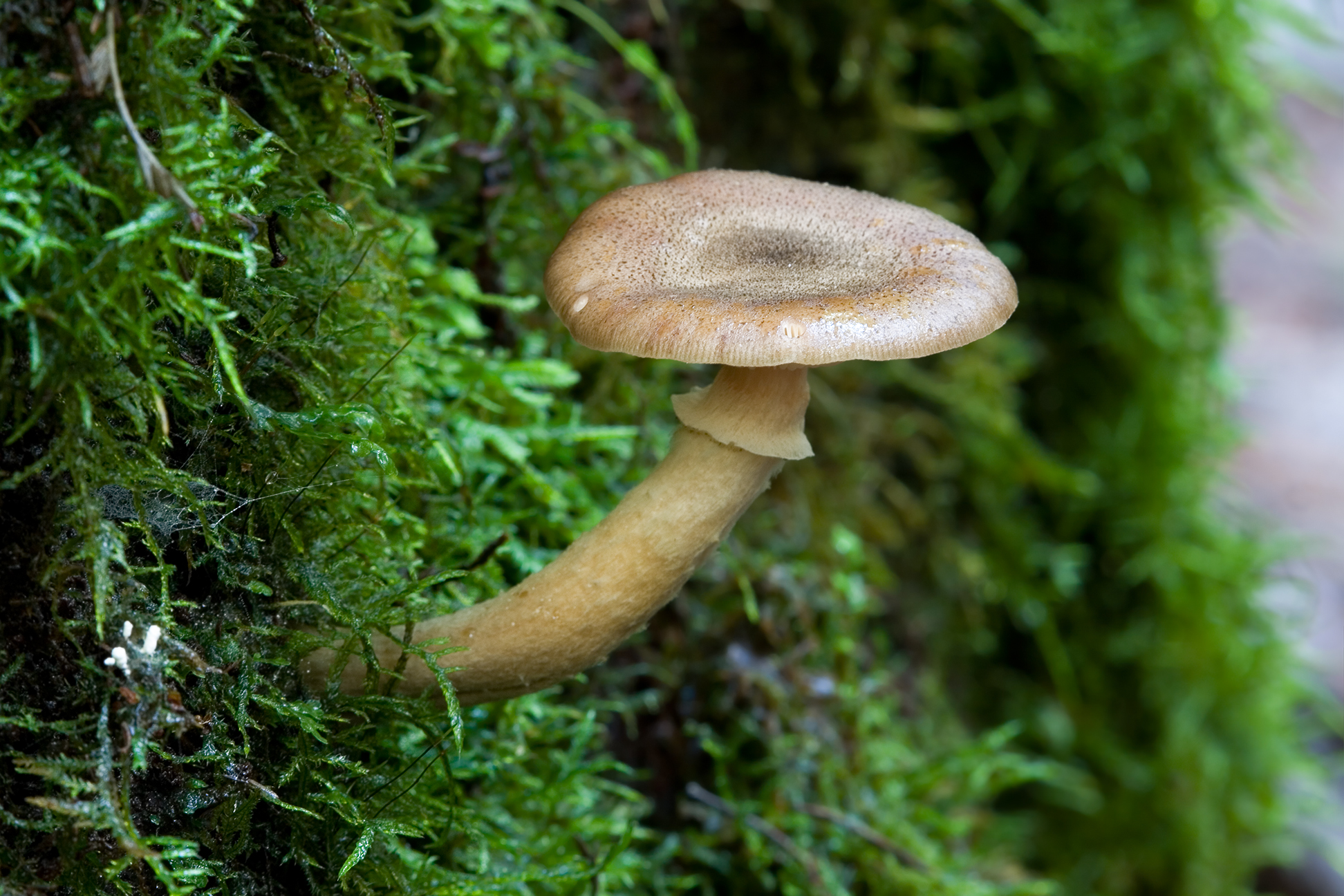

Scientific classification
- Kingdom: Fungi
- Division: Basidiomycota
- Class: Agaricomycetes
- Order: Agaricales
- Family: Physalacriaceae
- Genus: Armillaria
- Species: A. hinnulea

Binomial name
- Armillaria hinnulea Kile & Watling

= Armillaria hinnulea =

Species of fungus

Armillaria hinnulea is a species of mushroom in the family Physalacriaceae. This rare species is found only in Australia and New Zealand; in Australia, it is a secondary pathogen (i.e., causing disease only after a primary pathogen has damaged the host) of wet sclerophyll forests, and causes a woody root rot. A 2008 phylogenetic study of Australian and New Zealand populations of A. hinnulea suggests that the species was introduced to New Zealand from Australia on two occasions, once relatively recently and another time much longer ago.

== See also ==
- List of Armillaria species
