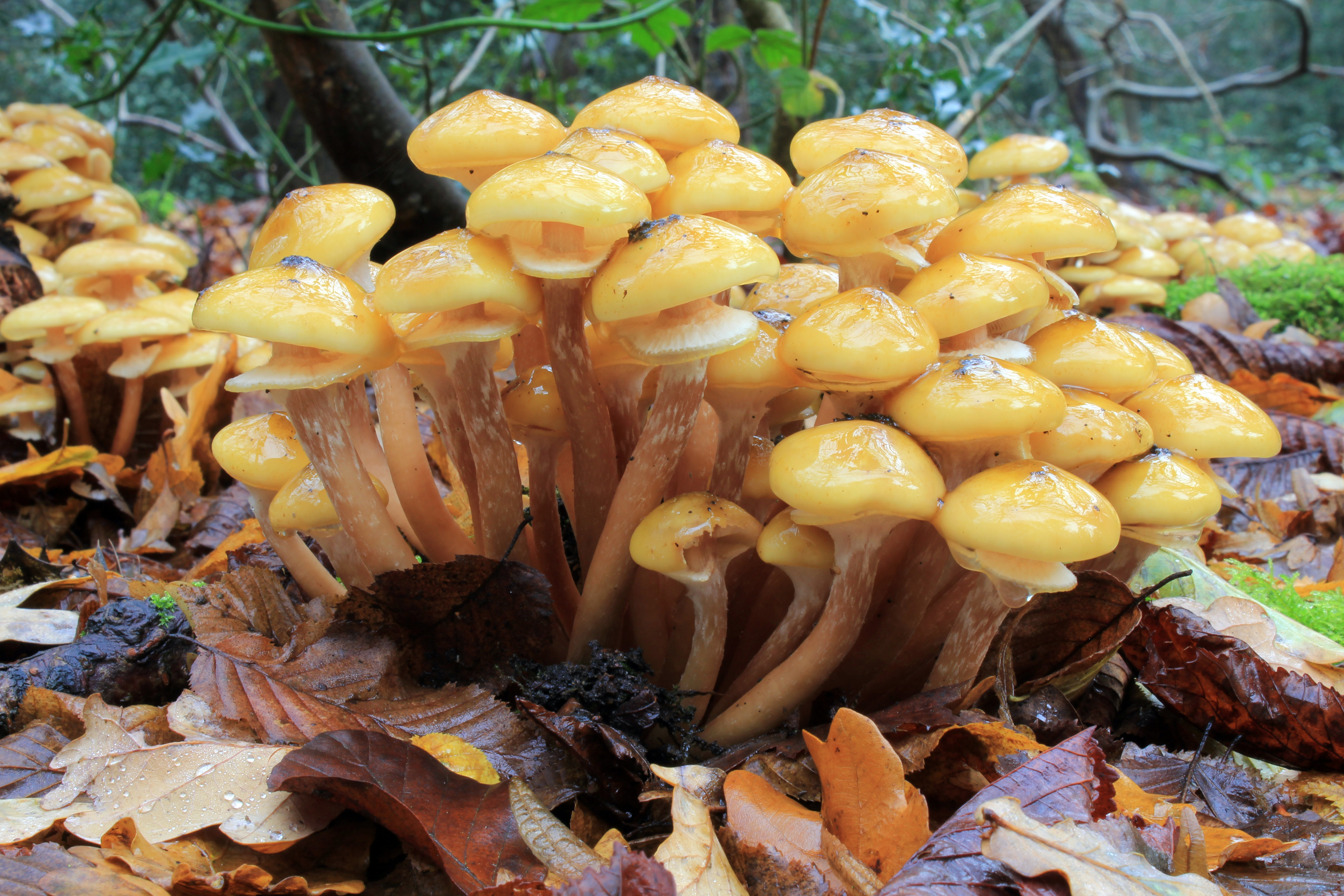
- Armillaria mellea

Scientific classification
- Kingdom: Fungi
- Division: Basidiomycota
- Class: Agaricomycetes
- Order: Agaricales
- Family: Physalacriaceae
- Genus: Armillaria (Fr.) Staude

Type species
- Armillaria mellea (Vahl) P. Kumm.

Diversity
- c. 45 species

= Armillaria =

Genus of fungi

Armillaria
- Mycological characteristics
- Gills on hymenium
- Cap is convex
- Hymenium is adnate
- Stipe has a ring
- Spore print is white
- Ecology is parasitic
- Edibility is edible

Armillaria is a genus of fungi that includes the A. mellea species ('honey fungus') that live on trees and woody shrubs. It includes about 10 species formerly categorized summarily as A. mellea. Armillaria sp. are long-lived and form the largest living fungi in the world. The largest known specimen (an A. ostoyae) covers more than 3.4 square miles (8.8 km^{2}) in Oregon and is estimated to be 2,500 years old. Some species of Armillaria display bioluminescence.

Armillaria can be a destructive forest pathogen. It causes "white rot" root disease. As it feeds on dead plant material, it can kill its host with little negative effect to itself.

== Taxonomy ==
The name Armillaria was defined in 1821 by Elias Magnus Fries, but at that time most gilled mushrooms were considered to belong to genus Agaricus and Armillaria was only a subgenus (a "tribe"). In 1857, Friedrich Staude established the independent genus.

Armillaria species morphologically similar to A. mallea were not effectively distinguished until the development of "biological species" defined as intersterile groups by Veikko Hintikka in 1973. Using a similar technique, Kari Korhonen showed in 1978 that the European Armillaria mellea species complex could be separated into five reproductively isolated species, which he named "European Biological Species" (EBS) A through E. About the same time, the North American A. mellea was shown to be ten different species (North American Biological Species, or NABS I through X).

Intersterile biological species of Armillaria defined in Europe and North America
Code	Taxonomic treatment	Compatibility	Known range
EBS A	Armillaria borealis Marxmüller & Korhonen (1982)		Finland
EBS B	Armillaria cepistipes Velen. (1920)	NABS III (part + rg), NABS IV (part)	Finland, Germany
EBS C	Armillaria ostoyae (Romagn.) Herink	NABS I (part)	Finland
EBS D	Armillaria mellea (Vahl ex Fr.) Karst	NABS VIII (part + rg)	Finland
EBS E	Armillaria gallica (Marxmüller & Romagn.)	NABS III (part + rg)	France
NABS I	Armillaria ostoyae (Romagn.) Herink	EBS C (part)	Vermont, British Columbia, Prairie Provinces (both boreal and subalpine regions), Ontario, Quebec.
NABS II	Armillaria gemina Bérubé & Dessureault		Vermont, Quebec.
NABS III	Armillaria calvescens Bérubé & Dessureault	EBS B and E (part + rg)	Vermont, Prairie Provinces, Ontario, Quebec.
NABS IV		EBS B (part), NABS V (very low?)	Vermont
NABS V	Armillaria sinapina Bérubé & Dessureault	EBS B (5.5%)	New York (state), British Columbia, Prairie Provinces, Ontario, Quebec.
NABS VI	Armillaria mellea (Vahl.:Fries) Kummer	EBS D (part)	Massachusetts, Quebec.
NABS VII	Armillaria gallica (Marxmüller & Romagn.)		Vermont, Michigan, British Columbia
NABS VIII		EBS D (part + rg)	New York, Michigan.
NABS IX	Armillaria nabsnona T. J. Volk & Burds. (1996)		Idaho, British Columbia.
NABS X	Armillaria altimontana Brazee, B. Ortiz, Banik & D. L. Lindner (2012)	NABS V, NABS XI (both <5%)	Idaho, British Columbia.
NABS XI	Armillaria cepistipes Velen. (1920)	EBS B (57%)	British Columbia

Similar lists of biological species have been constructed by mycologists working in Japan (10 as of 1998) and China (16 as of 2024).

Further data from molecular diagnostic tools have removed much uncertainty for mycologists and forest pathologists. New questions remain unanswered regarding the phylogeny of North American Armillaria species and their relationships to their European counterparts, particularly within the "Armillaria mellea complex". Some data suggest that North American and European A. gallica isolates are not monophyletic. Although North American and European isolates of A. gallica may be interfertile, some North American isolates of A. gallica are more closely related to the North American taxon A. calvescens than to European isolates of A. gallica. The increase in genetic divergence has not necessarily barred inter-sterility between isolated populations of A. gallica. Although the relationships among some groups in the genus seem clearer, the investigation of geographically diverse isolates has revealed that the relationship between some North American species is still unclear (Hughes et al. 2003). A similar situation happens in China, where some molecular phylogenetic data appear to line up with intersterile "biological species" and others do not.

Armillaria root rot occurs in the Northwest Territories, and was identified on white spruce at Pine Point on Great Slave Lake prior to NABS findings.

=== Rhizomorpha ===
In 1791 Albrecht Wilhelm Roth described the species Rhizomorpha fragilis for a collection which consisted entirely of rhizomorphs. The genus Rhizomorpha thus became established and later these mycelial cords were shown to belong to Armillaria mellea. According to the code of nomenclature that means that the two genus names are synonyms and since genus Armillaria was not defined until 1857, the name Rhizomorpha takes precedence and should replace the name Armillaria. To avoid this, a 2021 paper by Stalpers et al. proposes that the name Armillaria should be protected. The proposal awaits decisions by the Nomenclature Committee for Fungi and eventually by an International Botanical Congress.

== Description ==
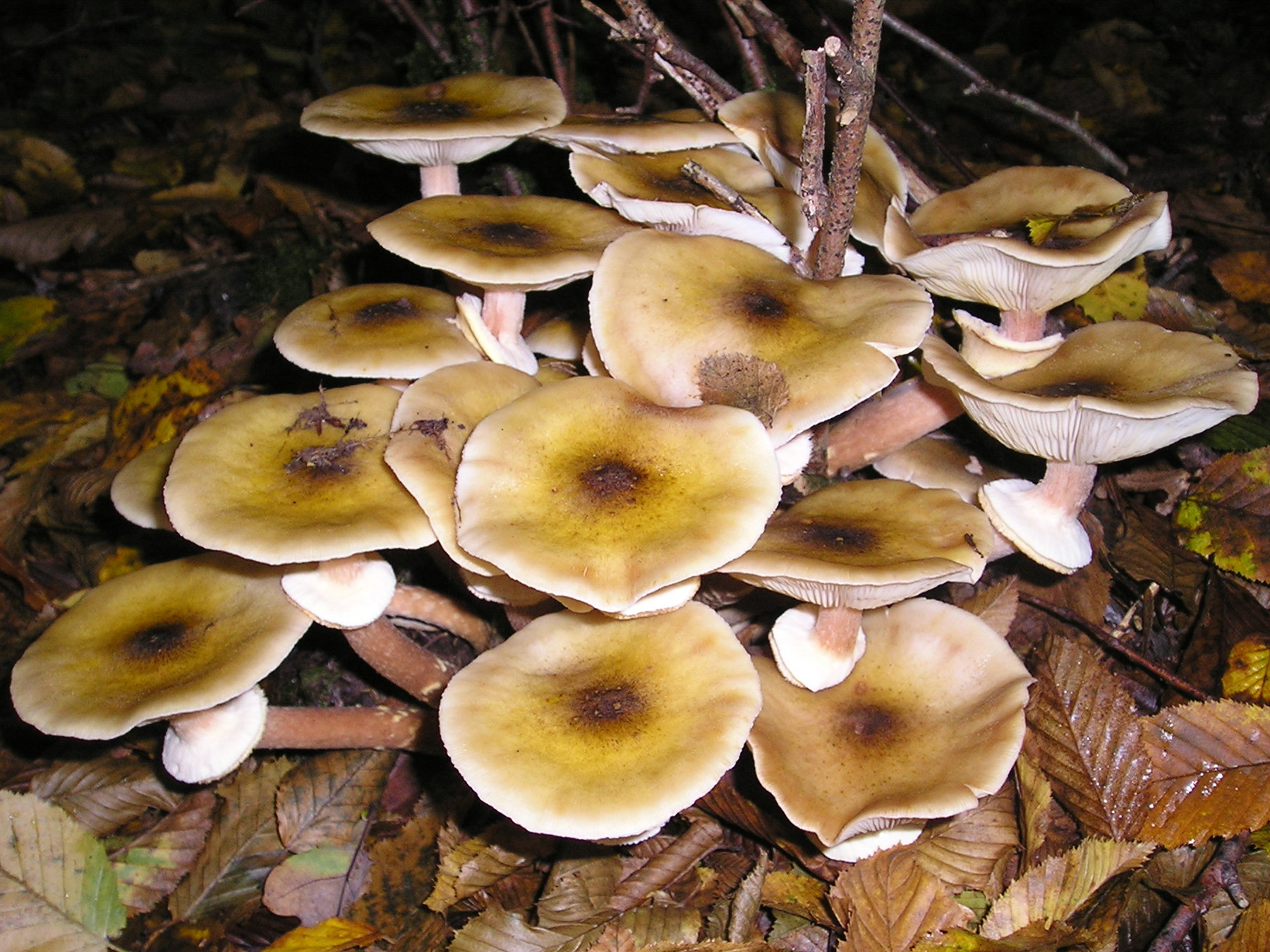
Armillaria mellea

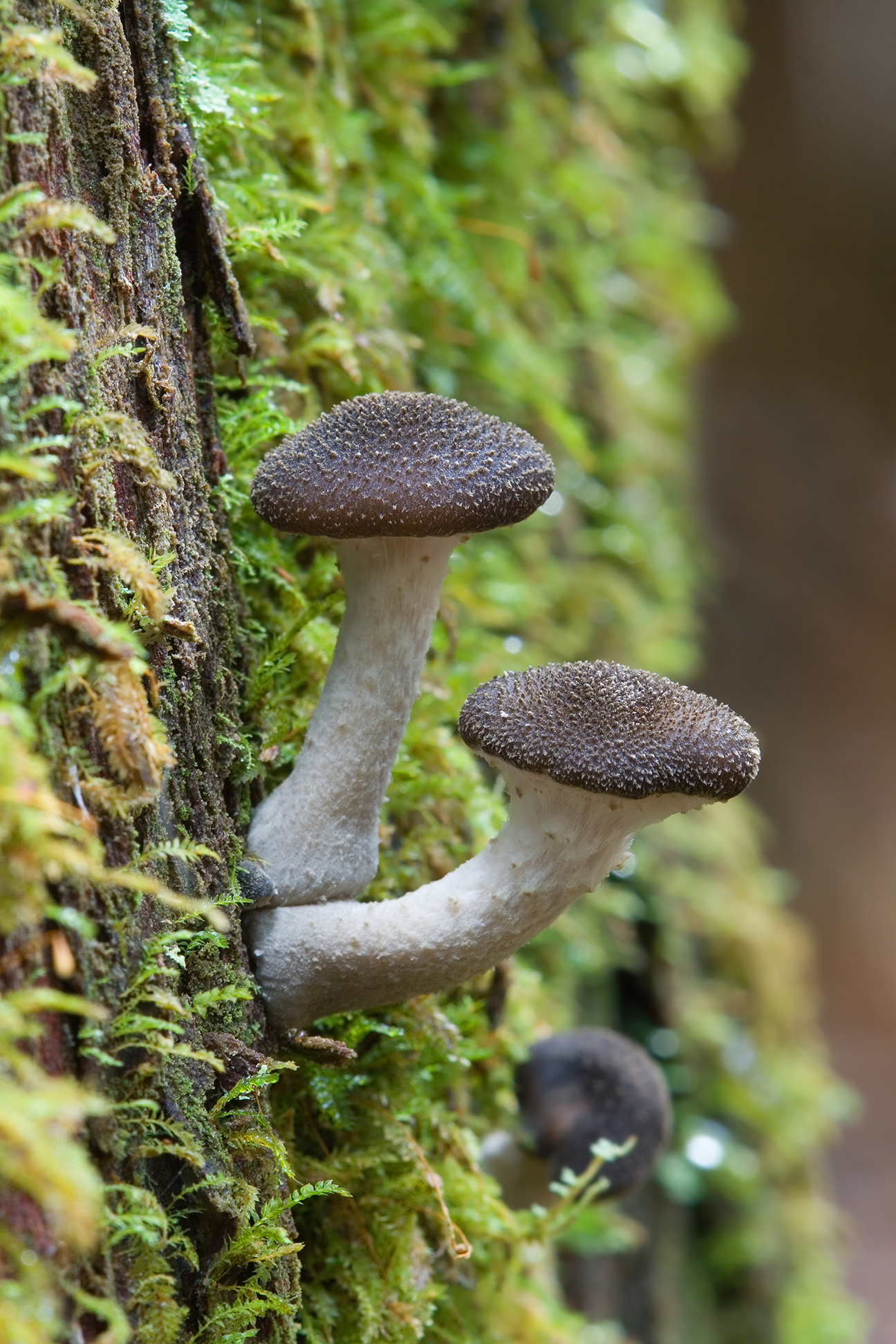
Armillaria hinnulea

The basidiocarp (reproductive structure) of the fungus is a mushroom that grows on wood, typically in small dense clumps or tufts. Their caps (mushroom tops) are typically yellow-brown, somewhat sticky to touch when moist, and, depending on age, may range in shape from conical to convex to depressed in the center. The stipe (stalk) may or may not have a ring. All Armillaria species have a white spore print and none have a volva (cup at base).

Armillaria species are long-lived and form the largest living fungi in the world. The largest known organism (of the species A. ostoyae) covers more than 3.4 square miles (8.8 km^{2}) in Oregon's Malheur National Forest and is estimated to be 2,500 years old. Some species display bioluminescence, known as foxfire.

=== Similar species ===
Similar species include Pholiota spp. which also grow in cespitose (mat-like) clusters on wood and fruit in the fall. Pholiota spp. are separated from Armillaria by its yellowish to greenish-yellow tone and a dark brown to grey-brown spore print. Mushroom hunters need to be wary of Galerina spp. which can grow side by side with Armillaria spp. on wood. Galerina have a dark brown spore print and are deadly poisonous (alpha-amanitin).

The white spore print and lack of volva can be compared to Amanita. As a white rot, it is distinguished from Tricholoma, a mycorrhizal (non-parasitic) genus.

== Pathology ==
Honey fungus is a white-rot fungus, which is a pathogenic organism that affects trees, shrubs, woody climbers and rarely, woody herbaceous perennial plants. Honey fungus can grow on living, decaying, and also dead plant material (being a facultative saprophyte). This means it can kill its host with little consequence, unlike parasites that must moderate their growth to avoid host death.

Honey fungus spreads from living trees, dead and live roots and stumps by means of reddish-brown to black rhizomorphs (root-like structures) at the rate of approximately 3.3 feet (1 m) a year, but infection by root contact is possible. Infection by spores is rare. Rhizomorphs grow close to the soil surface (in the top 7.9 inches (20 cm)) and invade new roots, or the root collar (where the roots meet the stem) of plants. An infected tree will die once the fungus has girdled it, or when significant root damage has occurred. Additionally, Infections can occur through the activity of wood boring beetles. For example, Agrilus biguttatus most commonly girdle in oak trees, which allows fungi to grow in the stems of these infected trees. This can happen rapidly, or may take several years. Infected plants will deteriorate, although may exhibit prolific flower or fruit production shortly before death.

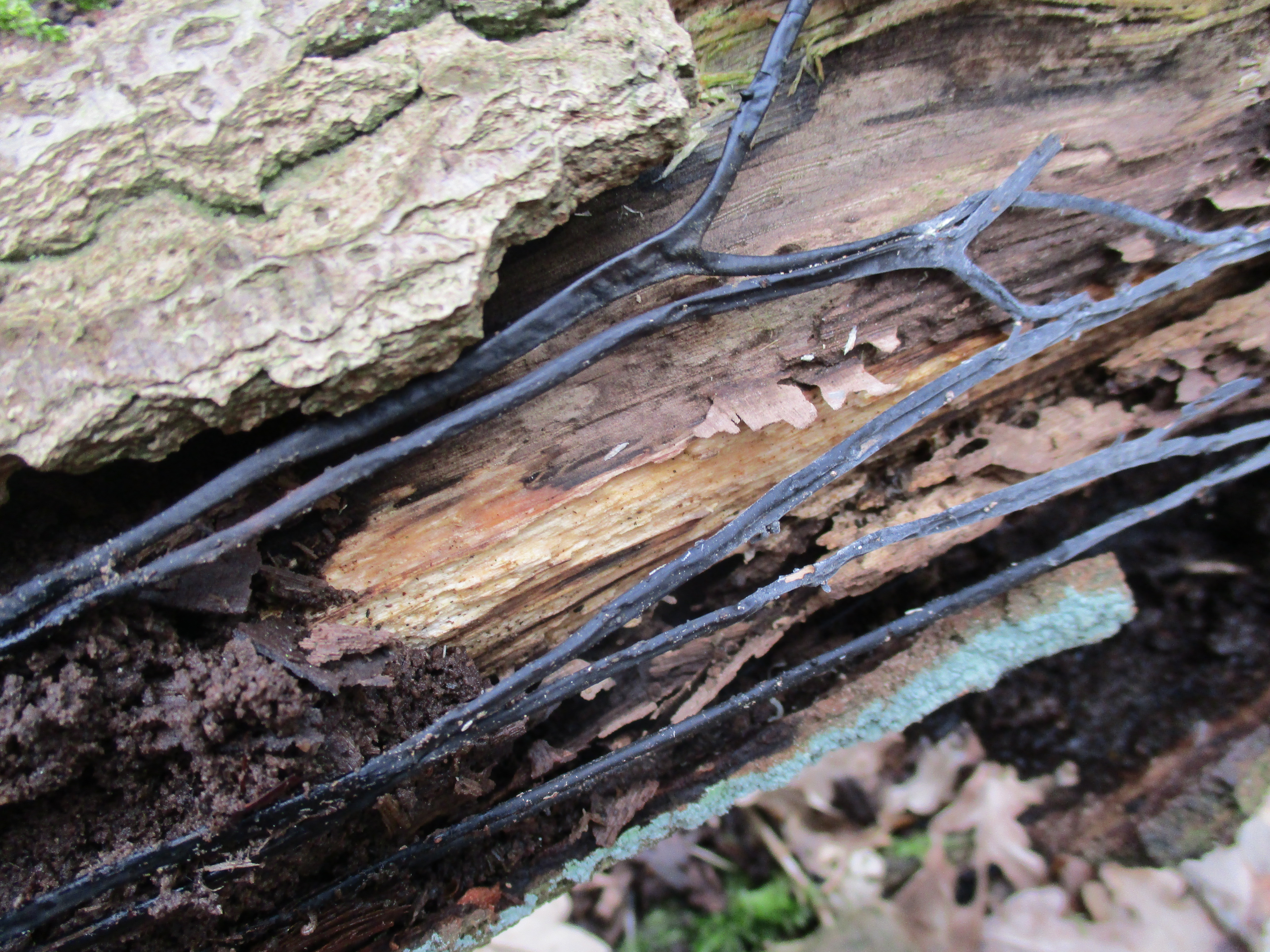
Mycelial cords Armillaria

Initial symptoms of honey fungus infection include dieback or shortage of leaves in spring. Rhizomorphs (also called mycelial cords) appear under the bark and around the tree, and mushrooms grow in clusters from the infected plant in autumn and die back after the first frost. However these symptoms and signs do not necessarily mean that the pathogenic strains of honey fungus are the cause, so other identification methods are advised before diagnosis. Thin sheets of cream colored mycelium, beneath the bark at the base of the trunk or stem indicated that honey fungus is likely the pathogen. It will give off a strong mushroom scent and the mushrooms sometimes extend upward. On conifers honey fungus often exudes a gum or resin from cracks in the bark.

=== Hosts ===
Potential hosts include conifers and various monocotyledonous and dicotyledonous trees, shrubs, and herbaceous species, ranging from asparagus and strawberry to large forest trees (Patton and Vasquez Bravo 1967). Armillaria root rot enters hosts through the roots. In Alberta, 75% of trap logs (Mallett and Hiratsuka 1985) inserted into the soil between planted spruce became infected with the distinctive white mycelium of Armillaria within one year. Of the infestations, 12% were A. ostoyae, and 88% were A. sinapina (Blenis et al. 1995). Reviews of the biology, diversity, pathology, and control of Armillaria in Fox (2000) are useful.

== Edibility ==
Honey fungus are regarded in Ukraine, Russia, Poland, Germany and other European countries as one of the best wild mushrooms. They are commonly ranked above morels and chanterelles and only the cep/porcini is more highly prized. However, honey fungus must be thoroughly cooked as they are mildly poisonous raw. Honey mushrooms are one of four UK species that can cause sickness when ingested with alcohol. For those unfamiliar with the species, it is advisable not to drink alcohol for 12 hours before and 24 hours after eating this mushroom to avoid any possible nausea and vomiting. However, if these rules are followed, this variety of mushroom is a delicacy with a distinctive mushroomy and nutty flavour. Reference texts for identification are Collins Complete British Mushrooms and Toadstools for the variety of field pictures in it, and Roger Philips' Mushrooms for the quality of his out of field pictures and descriptions.

In Norway, some mycologists have started to regard honey fungus as poisonous, as the Norwegian health ministry is moving away from the parboiling practice.

== See also ==
- List of Armillaria species
