= Rowan Thomson =

Canadian physicist

Academic background
- Education: University of Waterloo
- Thesis: Holographic Studies of Thermal Gauge Theories with Flavour (2007)

Academic work
- Discipline: Medical Physics
- Institutions: Carleton University
- Website: https://people.physics.carleton.ca/~rthomson/index.html

Rowan Thomson is a professor in the Department of Physics at Carleton University and Assistant Dean (Equity, Diversity and Inclusion) in the Faculty of Science. She is a Canada Research Chair in Radiotherapy Physics.

== Background and education ==
Thomson received a Double BSc degree in Honours Mathematics and Physics from Carleton University. She earned her PhD from Perimeter Institute and the University of Waterloo in 2007 where she studied Superstring Theory.

== Career ==
Thomson's research focuses on developing computational and theoretical techniques to study the interactions of radiation with matter, including radiation transport and energy deposition at or below the cellular level, multiscale modeling, and fundamental dosimetry. She has also developed the software package egs_brachy, an open-source Monte Carlo simulator of brachytherapy.

== Awards and honors ==
Professor Thomson was awarded Ontario’s Polanyi Prize in Physics (2011), an Ontario Early Researcher Award (2015), and elected a Fellow of the American Association of Physicists in Medicine in 2020; her research has been recognized with the Sylvia Fedoruk Prize and the Moses & Sylvia Sorkin Greenfield Award.
