= Resilience (mathematics) =

Mathematical measure of transient behavior

Ball-and-valley analogy of resilience. A resilient steady state can be thought of as a ball in a deep valley, and it takes a large perturbation to move the ball away to an alternative steady state. A steady state that is less resilient can be thought of as a ball in a shallow valley, where smaller perturbations can be enough to make the system unstable.

In mathematical modeling, resilience refers to the ability of a dynamical system to recover from perturbations and return to its original stable steady state. It is a measure of the stability and robustness of a system in the face of changes or disturbances. If a system is not resilient enough, it is more susceptible to perturbations and can more easily undergo a critical transition. A common analogy used to explain the concept of resilience of an equilibrium is one of a ball in a valley. A resilient steady state corresponds to a ball in a deep valley, so any push or perturbation will very quickly lead the ball to return to the resting point where it started. On the other hand, a less resilient steady state corresponds to a ball in a shallow valley, so the ball will take a much longer time to return to the equilibrium after a perturbation.

The concept of resilience is particularly useful in systems that exhibit tipping points, whose study has a long history that can be traced back to catastrophe theory. While this theory was initially overhyped and fell out of favor, its mathematical foundation remains strong and is now recognized as relevant to many different systems.

== History ==
In 1973, Canadian ecologist C. S. Holling proposed a definition of resilience in the context of ecological systems. According to Holling, resilience is "a measure of the persistence of systems and of their ability to absorb change and disturbance and still maintain the same relationships between populations or state variables". Holling distinguished two types of resilience: engineering resilience and ecological resilience. Engineering resilience refers to the ability of a system to return to its original state after a disturbance, such as a bridge that can be repaired after an earthquake. Ecological resilience, on the other hand, refers to the ability of a system to maintain its identity and function despite a disturbance, such as a forest that can regenerate after a wildfire while maintaining its biodiversity and ecosystem services. With time, the once well-defined and unambiguous concept of resilience has experienced a gradual erosion of its clarity, becoming more vague and closer to an umbrella term than a specific concrete measure.

== Definition ==
Mathematically, resilience can be approximated by the inverse of the return time to an equilibrium given by

$\text{resilience} \equiv -\text{Re}(\lambda_1(\textbf{A}))$

where $\lambda_1$ is the maximum eigenvalue of matrix $\textbf{A}$.

The largest this value is, the faster a system returns to the original stable steady state, or in other words, the faster the perturbations decay.

== Applications and examples ==
In ecology, resilience might refer to the ability of the ecosystem to recover from disturbances such as fires, droughts, or the introduction of invasive species. A resilient ecosystem would be one that is able to adapt to these changes and continue functioning, while a less resilient ecosystem might experience irreversible damage or collapse. The exact definition of resilience has remained vague for practical matters, which has led to a slow and proper application of its insights for management of ecosystems.

In epidemiology, resilience may refer to the ability of a healthy community to recover from the introduction of infected individuals. That is, a resilient system is more likely to remain at the disease-free equilibrium after the invasion of a new infection. Some stable systems exhibit critical slowing down where, as they approach a basic reproduction number of 1, their resilience decreases, hence taking a longer time to return to the disease-free steady state.

Resilience is an important concept in the study of complex systems, where there are many interacting components that can affect each other in unpredictable ways. Mathematical models can be used to explore the resilience of such systems and to identify strategies for improving their resilience in the face of environmental or other changes. For example, when modelling networks it is often important to be able to quantify network resilience, or network robustness, to the loss of nodes. Scale-free networks are particularly resilient since most of their nodes have few links. This means that if some nodes are randomly removed, it is more likely that the nodes with fewer connections are taken out, thus preserving the key properties of the network.

== See also ==
- Engineering resilience
- Ecological resilience
- Critical transition
- Bifurcation theory
