= Oksana Chubykalo-Fesenko =

Ukrainian physicist

Oksana Chubykalo-Fesenko is a Spanish-Ukrainian physicist and materials scientist whose research interests include spintronics and the dynamics and multiscale modeling of magnetic materials and magnetic nanoparticles. She works in Spain as a senior scientist at the Materials Science Institute of Madrid, a research institute of the Spanish National Research Council.

== Education and career ==
Chubykalo-Fesenko was a student at the National University of Kharkiv (then called Kharkiv State University) where she received a master's degree in 1986 and a Ph.D. in 1990, with the dissertation Soliton scattering by inpurities in one-dimensional nonlinear systems.

She worked as a researcher at the Clarendon Laboratory of the University of Oxford, at the Complutense University of Madrid, at the University of Milan, at the University of the Basque Country, and at the IBM Almaden Research Center in California, before taking her present position at the Materials Science Institute of Madrid. She joined the institute in 2001 as a Ramon y Cajal Fellow, obtained a tenured scientist position in 2002, and has been senior scientist since 2004.

== Recognition ==
Chubykalo-Fesenko was named to the 2025 class of IEEE Fellows, "for development of multiscale methods for modeling of thermal magnetization dynamics."
