= Rachel Getman =

American researcher

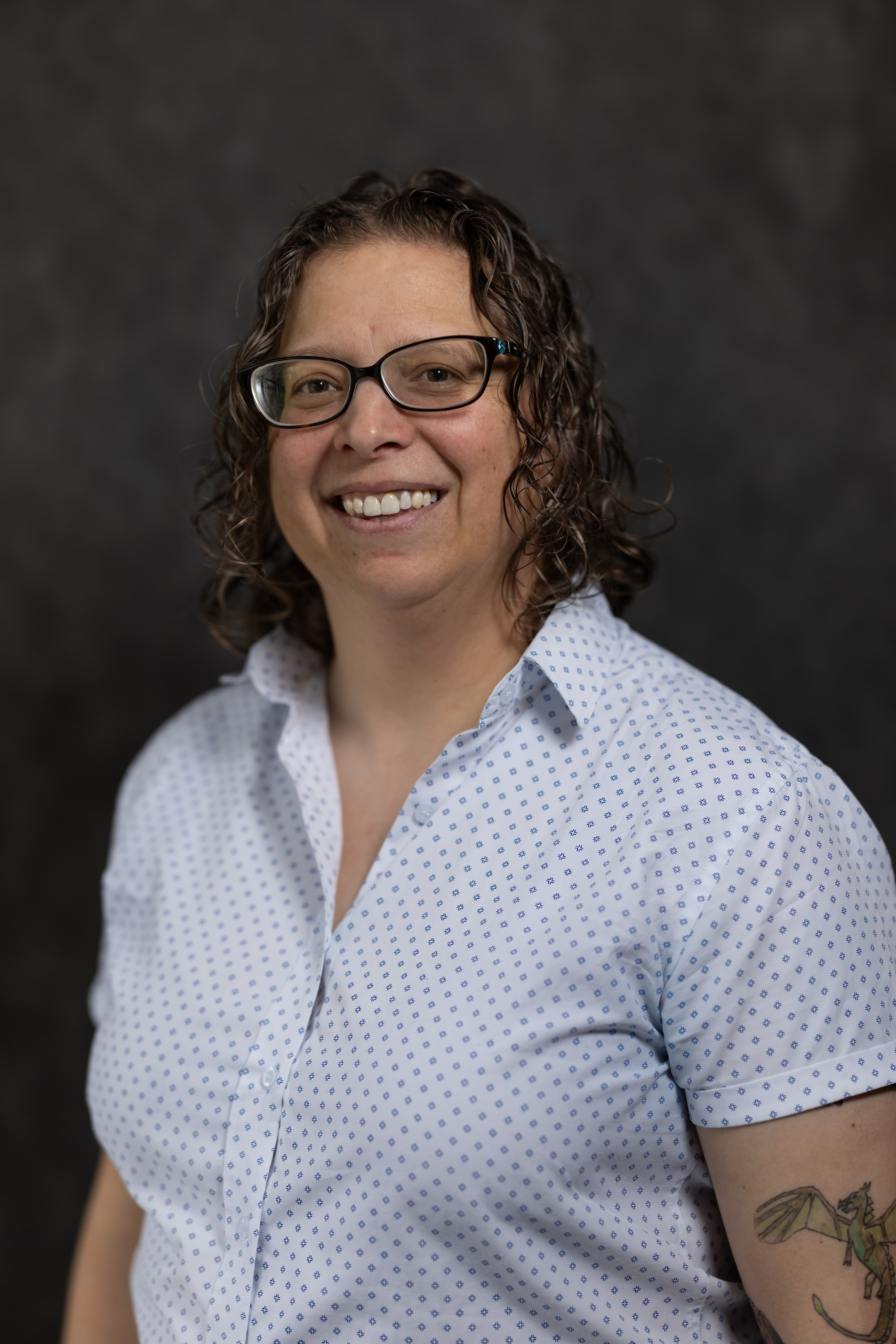
- Education: University of Notre Dame
- Scientific career
- Thesis: Simulation of NO oxidation catalysis over oxygen-covered transition metal surfaces (2009)

Rachel B. Getman is a professor and the Bernice L. Claugus Endowed Chair of Chemical and Biomolecular Engineering at Ohio State University. She is known for her work examining the interface between fluids and solid materials using computational tools.

== Education ==
Getman received her B.S. degrees in 2004 where she studied chemical engineering and business administration at Michigan Technological University. She earned her Ph.D. from the University of Notre Dame in 2009. From 2009 until 2011 Getman was a postdoctoral research fellow at Northwestern University.

== Career ==
Getman became an assistant professor at Clemson University in 2011. In 2017, she became the first female faculty member to receive tenure in Clemson University's Department of Chemical and Biomolecular Engineering. In 2020, she was awarded the Murdoch Family Endowed Professorship for prominence in research, scholarship, and teaching. Getman was promoted to Full Professor by Clemson University in 2022. In 2023 Getman moved to Ohio State University and was named the Bernice L. Claugus Endowed Chair in 2023.

== Research ==
Getman's early research was in catalysis where she focused on how platinum facilitates changes in nitrogen oxides. In 2024 she worked on multiscale modeling to quantify entropies of hydration in heterogeneously catalyzed systems. Her group developed a method that combines classical molecular dynamics with density functional theory for this purpose.

== Selected publications ==
- Getman, Rachel B.; Xu, Ye; Schneider, William F. (2008-07-01). "Thermodynamics of Environment-Dependent Oxygen Chemisorption on Pt(111)". The Journal of Physical Chemistry C. 112 (26): 9559–9572. doi:10.1021/jp800905a. ISSN 1932-7447.
- Getman, R. B.; Schneider, W. F.; Smeltz, A. D.; Delgass, W. N.; Ribeiro, F. H. (2009-02-17). "Oxygen-Coverage Effects on Molecular Dissociations at a Pt Metal Surface". Physical Review Letters. 102 (7) 076101. doi:10.1103/PhysRevLett.102.076101. ISSN 0031-9007.
- Getman, Rachel B.; Miller, Jacob H.; Wang, Kenneth; Snurr, Randall Q. (2011-02-10). "Metal Alkoxide Functionalization in Metal−Organic Frameworks for Enhanced Ambient-Temperature Hydrogen Storage". The Journal of Physical Chemistry C. 115 (5): 2066–2075. doi:10.1021/jp1094068. ISSN 1932-7447.
- Getman, Rachel B.; Bae, Youn-Sang; Wilmer, Christopher E.; Snurr, Randall Q. (2012-02-08). "Review and Analysis of Molecular Simulations of Methane, Hydrogen, and Acetylene Storage in Metal–Organic Frameworks". Chemical Reviews. 112 (2): 703–723. doi:10.1021/cr200217c. ISSN 0009-2665.
- Estejab, Ali; Cárcamo, Ricardo A. García; Getman, Rachel B. (2022-02-16). "Influence of an electrified interface on the entropy and energy of solvation of methanol oxidation intermediates on platinum(111) under explicit solvation". Physical Chemistry Chemical Physics. 24 (7): 4251–4261. Bibcode:2022PCCP...24.4251E. doi:10.1039/D1CP05358B. ISSN 1463-9084. PMID 35107094.

== Awards and honors ==
Getman received a National Science Foundation CAREER Award in 2016.
