= Mycelial cord =

Structure produced by fungi

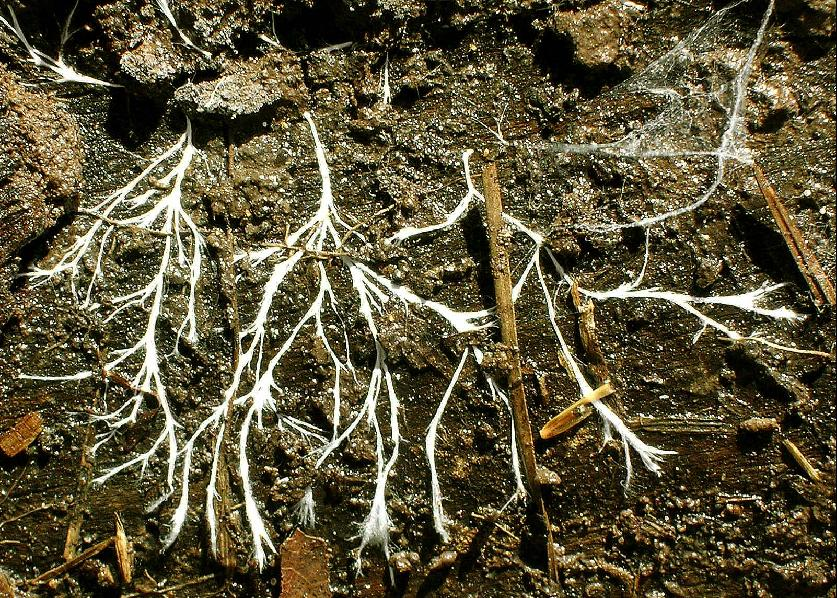
Mycelial cords found under a rotting log

Mycelial cords are linear aggregations of parallel-oriented hyphae. The mature cords are composed of wide, empty vessel hyphae surrounded by narrower sheathing hyphae. Cords may look similar to plant roots, and also frequently have similar functions; hence they are also called rhizomorphs (literally, "root-forms"). As well as growing underground or on the surface of trees and other plants, some fungi make mycelial cords which hang in the air from vegetation.

Mycelial cords are capable of conducting nutrients over long distances. For instance, they can transfer nutrients to a developing fruiting body, or enable wood-rotting fungi to grow through soil from an established food base in search of new food sources. For parasitic fungi, they can help spread infection by growing from established clusters to uninfected parts. The cords of some wood-rotting fungi (like Serpula lacrymans) may be capable of penetrating masonry.

The mechanism of the cord formation is not yet precisely understood. Mathematical models suggest that some fields or gradients of signalling chemicals, parallel to the cord axis, may be involved.

Rhizomorphs can grow up to 9 m (30 ft) in length and 5 mm (1/4 in) in diameter.

== Rhizomorph ==
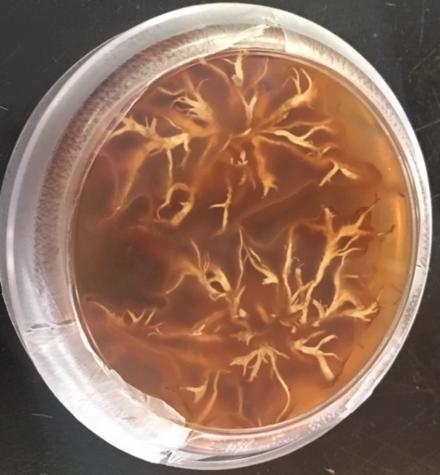
Unmelanized rhizomorphs of Desarmillaria tabescens in Malt yeast extract medium

Rhizomorphs are a special morphological adaptation root-like structures found in fungi. These root-like structures are composed of parallel-oriented hyphae that can be found in several species of wood-decay and ectomycorrhizal basidiomycete as well as ascomycete fungi. Rhizomorphs can facilitate the colonization of some dry-rot fungi such as Serpula lacrymans and Meruliporia incrassata and cause damage to homes in Europe and North America, respectively, by decaying wood. Another genus that is very well studied for their abundance of rhizomorphs production is Armillaria, with some species being pathogens and others saprotrophs of trees and shrubs.

Known for their role in facilitating the spread and colonization of fungi in the environment, rhizomorphs are the most complex organs produced by fungi. They are made up of highly specialized hyphae that are different in size, orientation, and function. Fungi that possess these structures can compete and grow in harsh conditions.

Rhizomorphs are sometimes called mycelial cords, although they are structurally different: mycelial cords are less complex and have a loose network of hyphae giving an appearance of a fan-like mat, while rhizomorphs are more complex organs that have apically dominant growth tips, water-resistant surfaces, and can transport oxygen. Rhizomorphs and mycelial cords both function in nutrient transport, water absorption, translocation and colonization of substrates.

=== Development and morphology ===
The development of rhizomorphs begins with a submerged thallus that produces mycelium (hyphae biomass) that when deprived of nutrients and exposed to increasing oxygen, morphogenesis occurs giving rise to pseudo or microsclerotia (survival structures of some fungi), which precede rhizomorph development. Concentrations of oxygen play an important role in the production of rhizomorphs. When there is a high concentration of oxygen in the atmosphere, soil moisture, temperature and pH, rhizomorph production increases.

Rhizomorphs contain four differentiated types of tissues:

1. The outer layers are a compact growing point that make up the mucilage
2. The melanized wall that serves as protection against colonization by another microorganisms (bacteria or fungi)
3. The medulla that serves for conduction of water and dissolved nutrients
4. The central line used as an air conducting channel.

Rhizomorphs can be of a cylindrical or flat type, and melanized or unmelanized, respectively. The flat unmelanized type is more common under the bark of trees and the cylindrical melanized rhizomorph can be found in the root systems of trees. For example, species of Armillaria form melanized (dark or brown due to the formation of melanin) rhizomorphs in nature with the exception of Desarmillaria tabescens (formerly, Armillaria tabescens) which produces unmelanized rhizomorphs in culture.

=== Function ===
Rhizomorphs act as a system of underground absorption and growth structures that invade and decay roots and wood, as well as sometimes propagating through the air. They can access places where food resources are not available, giving certain advantages to the fungi that produce them in terms of competition. They act as an extension of the fungal body and allow the fungus to infect, disseminate and survive for long periods of time. Rhizomorphs are composed of a medulla and central line which are responsible for water, nutrient, and gas transportation. The transportation of oxygen occurs from the base of rhizomorphs to the terminal growing part (tips). Rhizomorphs that live under free oxygen conditions are able to absorb and transport nutrients.

== Example taxa ==
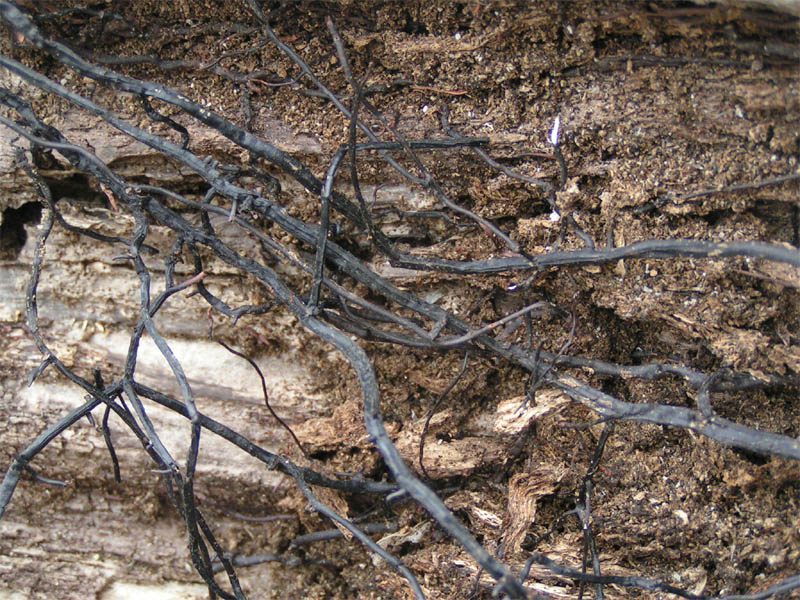
Armillaria cords

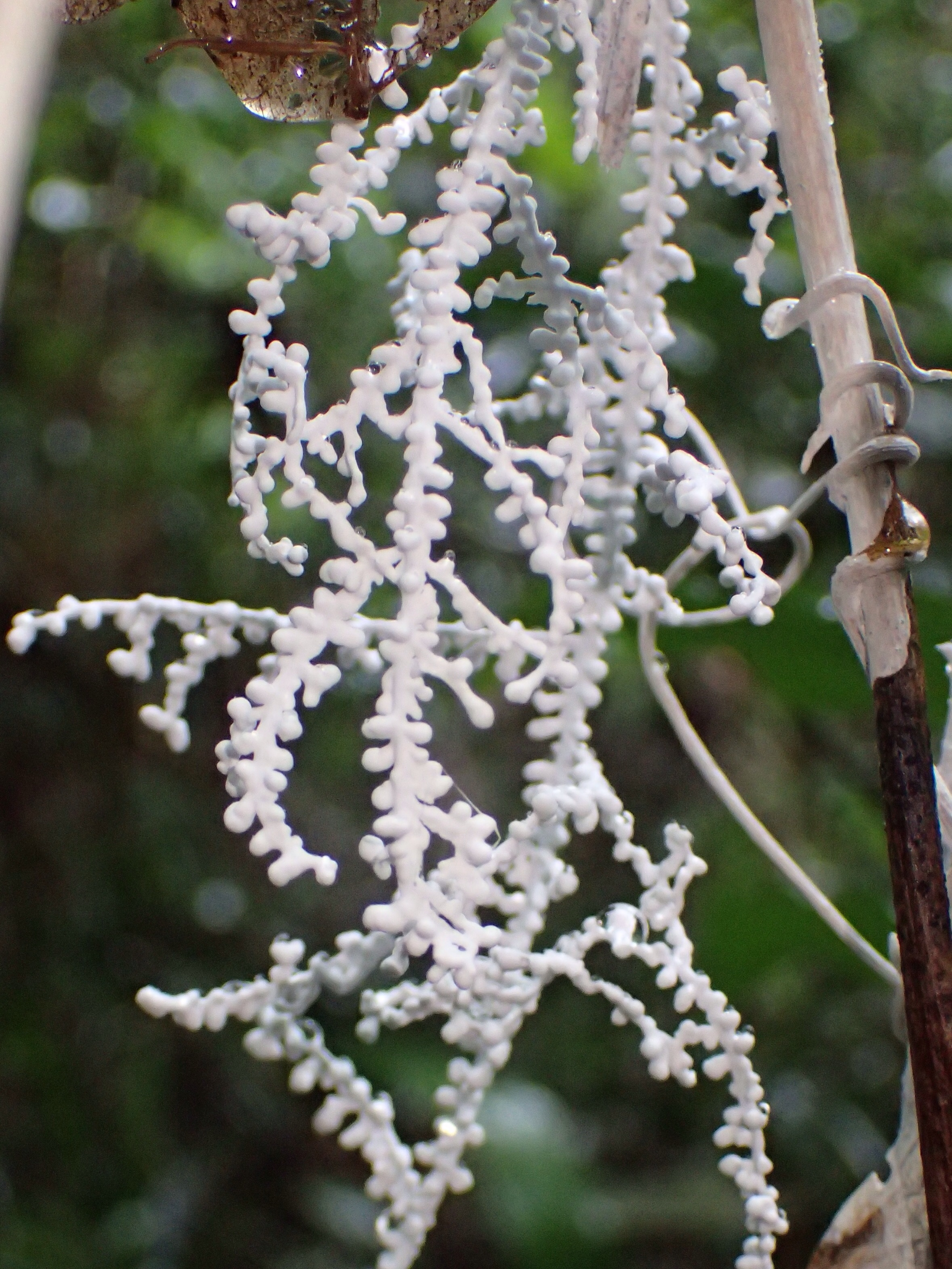
Aerial rhizomorphs of Brunneocorticium corynecarpon

=== Evolution of rhizomorphs in Armillaria species ===
The genus Armillaria is a well-studied and widely distributed mushroom-forming genus with rhizomorph production abundant in most species. One of the more common morphological characteristics for the genus is the presence of an annulus, which is a ring-like structure in the stem of the fruiting body with exception of the species Desarmillaria tabescens. This species is known to produce unmelanized rhizomorphs in-vitro, but it does not produce them in nature. In a controlled environment study with high levels of oxygen and saturated soil moisture content, Desarmillaria species produces melanized rhizomorphs However, these two conditions are difficult to find in the climate of today and could explain the lack of melanized rhizomorphs in nature and could be a carryover from previous evolutionary periods.

Rhizomorph traits can be found in all species of the Armillaria as well as other fungi but it appears that the most recently diverged species are adapted to form melanized rhizomorphs. Melanin in rhizomorphs are known for the absorption of metal ions from the soil and can be found in different structures such as spores and cell walls of fungi among others. Functions of melanin also include protecting against UV radiation and moisture stress. Thus melanin production aids in longevity and survival of rhizomorphs in the soil.

=== Aerial rhizomorphs in the Marasmiaceae ===
Brunneocorticium corynecarpon is a fungus known only from its branched white aerial rhizomorphs which grow in tropical forest canopies. DNA analysis has shown it to belong in the Marasmiaceae (normally a mushroom-forming family), but no fruiting bodies or other fertile structures of it have been found.

Marasmius crinis-equi ("Horse-hair fungus") is another species which generates aerial rhizomorphs, but these often have tiny mushrooms branching out from them.
