= Mark Horstemeyer =

Dean of the School of Engineering at Liberty University

Mark Frederick Horstemeyer (born November 11, 1962) is an American engineering researcher, academic, and author. He is currently a distinguished professor at Liberty University, after serving as the Dean of the School of Engineering at Liberty from 2019-2025. Prior to his time at Liberty, he was a Giles Distinguished Professor at Mississippi State University, where he held a chair position at the Center for Advanced Vehicular Systems (CAVS). He is currently a Senior Fellow for the Center for Apologetics at Liberty University.

Horstemeyer is known for his work in Integrated Computational Materials Engineering (ICME), and for coining the term "Creationeering", a framework integrating engineering principles with business entrepreneurship.

== Career ==
Horstemeyer was the Giles Distinguished Professor at Mississippi State University (MSU) and professor in the Mechanical Engineering Department at Mississippi State University (2002–2018), holding a Chair position for the Center for Advanced Vehicular Systems (CAVS) in Computational Solid Mechanics; he was also the Chief Technical Officer for CAVS. Before coming to MSU, he worked for Sandia National Laboratories for fifteen years (1987-2002) in the area of multiscale modeling for design.

Horstemeyer became dean of the School of Engineering at Liberty University in 2019. Horstemeyer stepped down from his role as dean in 2025 to focus on research.

== Published works ==
- Integrated Computational Materials Engineering (ICME) for Metals: Using Multiscale Modeling to Invigorate Engineering Design with Science (2012)
- Integrated Computational Materials Engineering (ICME) for Metals: Concepts and Case Studies (2018)
- Multiscale Biomechanical Modeling of the Brain (2021), edited with Raj Prabhu
- Path Crossings (2000)

== Work ==
=== ICME ===
Horstemeyer has published significant work in the field of Integrated Computational Materials Engineering (ICME), an approach that links computerized materials models at multiple scales to optimize product design. His work aims to reduce product development time by predicting material defects and performance history before physical prototyping. Horstemeyer has authored two textbooks on ICME, in 2012 and 2018.

=== Sports Safety ===
Horstemeyer has led research into improved football helmets designed to improve player safety. The design uses bio-inspired shock absorption features to dissipate kinetic energy and reduce the risk of concussion.

=== Creationeering and Apologetics ===
Horstemeyer is a Young Earth Creationist and serves on the board of the Creation Research Society.

In 2022, Horstemeyer coined and trademarked the term "Creationeering", a paradigm that incorporates engineering and business entrepreneurship principles in a Christian framework.

== Honors and awards ==
A list of the awards and honors are as follows:

- European Union Academy of Sciences (2017)
- American Association for the Advancement of Science (AAAS) Fellow (2013)
- Society of Automotive Engineering (SAE) Fellow (2012)
- West Virginia University Distinguished Alumni Award (2012)
- Giles Professor (Highest Honor at the university), Mississippi State University (2011)
- Plasticity Research Award for Young Investigator, International Conference on Plasticity, Puerto Vallarta, Mexico (2011)
- Honorary Professor at Xihua University, Sichuan Province, Chengdu, China (2010)
- American Society of Metals (ASM) Fellow (2010)
- Thomas French Alumni Achievement Award, Ohio State University (2009)
- Ralph Powe Award Mississippi State University (highest university research award) (2008)
- ASME Materials Division Chair (2007)
- Society of Automotive Engineering (SAE) Teeter Award (2007)
- National Leadership Entrepreneurial Award (2007)
- American Society of Mechanical Engineering (ASME) Fellow (2006)
- Institute of Physics Select Paper (most downloaded paper): A multiscale analysis of fixed-end simple shear using molecular dynamics, crystal plasticity, and a macroscopic internal state variable theory (2004)
- Baseball Hall of Fame Physics of Baseball Panel (2004)
- Appointed to ASME Materials Executive Board (2004)
- Columbia Accident Investigation Board Consultant (2003)
- American Foundry Society "Best Paper Award" (2003)
- DOE Recognition Award (2000) USCAR work
- R&D100 Award (2000) microstructure-property modeling
- American Foundrymen's Society Award (2000) casting modeling
- Society of Automotive Engineers (SAE) (1996) technical recognition award
- Sandia Doctoral Study Program (1993-1995) internal state variable plasticity
- Sandia Award For Excellence (1992) finite element lethality studies
- Sandia Award For Excellence (1990) weapons experiments
- Sandia Award For Excellence (1989) weapons design

He is a fellow of the American Society of Mechanical Engineers, the American Society of Metals, the American Association for the Advancement of Science, and the Society of Automotive Engineers.

Horstemeyer received the Fray International Sustainability Award at the FLOGEN Sustainable Industrial Processing Summit in 2022.
