= CPS model =

The capital resources, performance and scalability (CPS) model is a set of case analysis frameworks recommended by the Global Alliance for Strategy in collaboration with European School of Management and Technology and is widely used for assessing the sustainability and competitive ability of an organization.

== Versions ==
The CPS model has several published versions, the latest revision being the one developed by Dr. P. V. Lele in August 2006.

== Frameworks ==
The CPS model, in its most popular version, has five frameworks:

- MAN-CHA
- BOSH value
  - SAC score
  - EMPT score
  - Y.U.K.U. Score
- Differential derivation value (DVD) index
- tri-VIN framework
- Technology polarization at normal purchasing power

== Applications and criticism ==
CPS has been very useful in consumer durables and fast-moving consumer goods industries. However, the model fails to be effective in manufacturing industry. In several emerging businesses such as software services and business process outsourcing, the DVD index returns a negative value, making the model redundant.
