= Continuous modelling =

Mathematical practice

Continuous modelling is the mathematical practice of applying a model to continuous data (data which has a potentially infinite number, and divisibility, of attributes). They often use differential equations and are converse to discrete modelling.

Modelling is generally broken down into several steps:

- Making assumptions about the data: The modeller decides what is influencing the data and what can be safely ignored.
- Making equations to fit the assumptions.
- Solving the equations.
- Verifying the results: Various statistical tests are applied to the data and the model and compared.
- If the model passes the verification progress, putting it into practice.
- If the model fails the verification progress, altering it and subjecting it again to verification; if it persists in fitting the data more poorly than a competing model, it is abandoned.
