= Neighbour-sensing model =

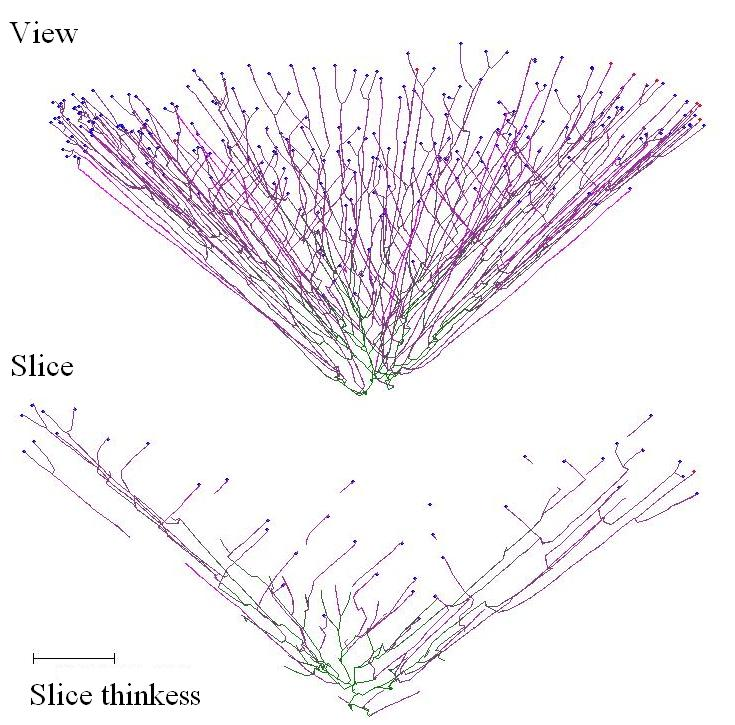
Development of the cone like structure (view above, slice below)

The neighbour-sensing mathematical model of hyphal growth is a set of interactive computer models that simulate the way fungi hyphae grow in three-dimensional space. The three-dimensional simulation is an experimental tool which can be used to study the morphogenesis of fungal hyphal networks.

The modelling process starts with the proposition that each hypha in the fungal mycelium generates a certain abstract field that, like known physical fields, decreases with increasing distance. Both scalar and vector fields are included in the models. The field(s) and its (their) gradient(s) are used to inform the algorithm that calculates the likelihood of branching, the angle of branching and the growth direction of each hyphal tip in the simulated mycelium. The growth vector is being informed of its surroundings. The virtual hyphal tip is 'sensing' the neighbouring mycelium; thus, it is called the neighbour-sensing model.

Cross-walls in living hyphae are formed only at right angles to the long axis of the hypha. A daughter hyphal apex can only arise if a branch is initiated. So, for fungi, hyphal branch formation is the equivalent of cell division in animals, plants, and protists. The position of origin of a branch and its direction and rate of growth are the main formative events in the development of fungal tissues and organs. Consequently, by simulating the mathematics of the control of hyphal growth and branching, the neighbour-sensing model provides the user with a way of experimenting with features that may regulate hyphal growth patterns during morphogenesis to arrive at suggestions that could be tested with live fungi.

The model was proposed by Audrius Meškauskas and David Moore in 2004, and developed using the supercomputing facilities of the University of Manchester. The key idea of this model is that all parts of the fungal mycelium have identical field generation systems, field sensing mechanisms and growth direction-altering algorithms. Under properly chosen model parameters, it is possible to observe the transformation of the initial unordered mycelium structure into various forms, some of which are natural-like fungal fruit bodies and other complex structures.

In one of the simplest examples, it is assumed that the hyphal tips try to keep a 45-degree orientation with relation to the Earth’s gravity vector field, and also generate some kind of scalar field that the growing tips try to avoid. This combination of parameters leads to the development of hollow conical structures, similar to the fruit bodies of some primitive fungi.

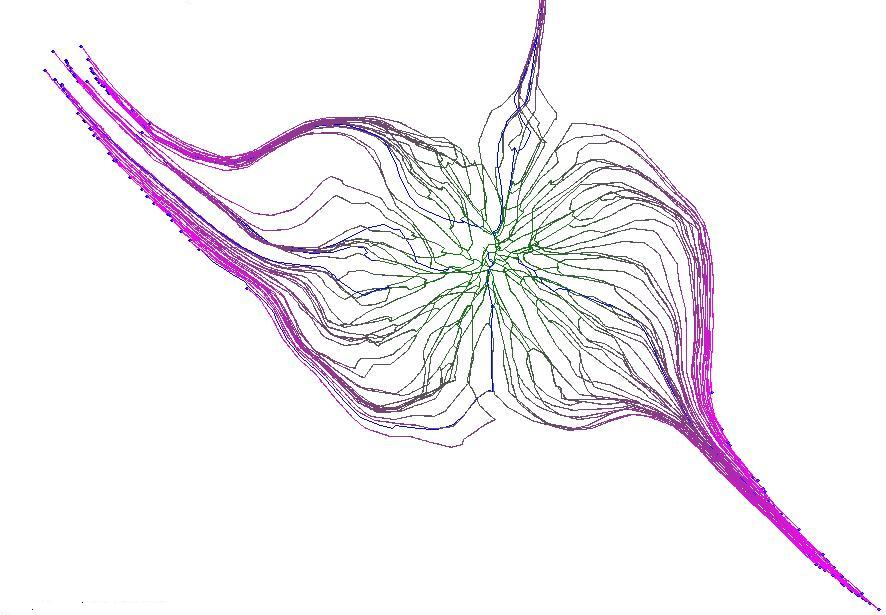
After changing the parameter set, the initially chaotic formation (in the center) starts forming cords.

In another example, the hypha generates a vector field parallel to the hyphal axis, and the tips tend to turn parallel to that field. After more tips turn in the same direction, their hyphae form a stronger directional field. In this way, it is possible to observe the spontaneous orientation of growing hypha in a single direction, which simulates the strands, cords and rhizomorphs produced by many species of fungi in nature. The parameters under which the model operates can be changed during its execution. This allows a greater variety of structures to be formed (including mushroom-like shapes) and may be supposed to simulate cases where the growth strategy depends on an internal biological clock. The neighbour-sensing model explains how various fungal structures may arise because of the ‘crowd behaviour’ (convergence) of the community of hyphal tips that make up the mycelium.

== Literature ==
- Meškauskas A, Fricker M.D, Moore D (2004). Simulating colonial growth of fungi with the neighbour-sensing model of hyphal growth. Mycological research, 108, 1241-1256. pdf
- Meškauskas, A., McNulty, Moore, D. (2004). Concerted regulation of tropisms in all hyphal tips is sufficient to generate most fungal structures. Mycological research, 108, 341-353. pdf
- Money NP. (2004) Theoretical biology: mushrooms in cyberspace. Nature, 431(7004):32. link
- Davidson A.F, Boswell G.P., Fischer M.W.F, Heaton L., Hofstadler D, Roper M. (2011). IMA Fungus. 2(1): 33–37. NCBI link

== Additional links ==
Further details are available from these websites: (primary) and (mirror). The programs, with extensive documentation, are distributed as freeware by both these sites.
