= Critical transition =

Abrupt shift in a complex dynamic system

Critical transitions are abrupt shifts in the state of ecosystems, the climate, financial and economic systems or other complex dynamical systems that may occur when changing conditions pass a critical or bifurcation point. As such, they are a particular type of regime shift. Recovery from such shifts may require more than a simple return to the conditions at which a transition occurred, a phenomenon called hysteresis. In addition to natural systems, critical transitions are also studied in psychology, medicine, economics, sociology, military, and several other disciplines.

== Early-warning signals ==
=== Critical slow down ===
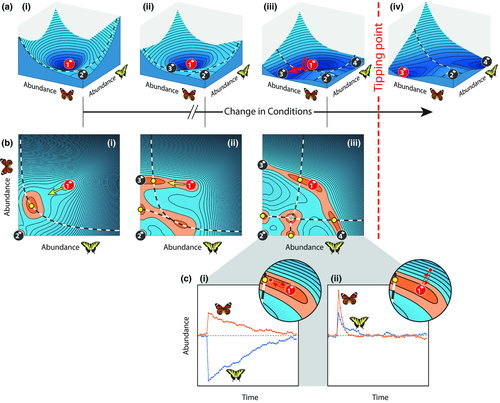
Graphical representation of alternative stable states and the direction of critical slowing down prior to a critical transition (taken from Lever et al. 2020). Top panels (a) indicate stability landscapes at different conditions. Middle panels (b) indicate the rates of change akin to the slope of the stability landscapes, and bottom panels (c) indicate a recovery from a perturbation towards the system's future state (c.I) and in another direction (c.II).

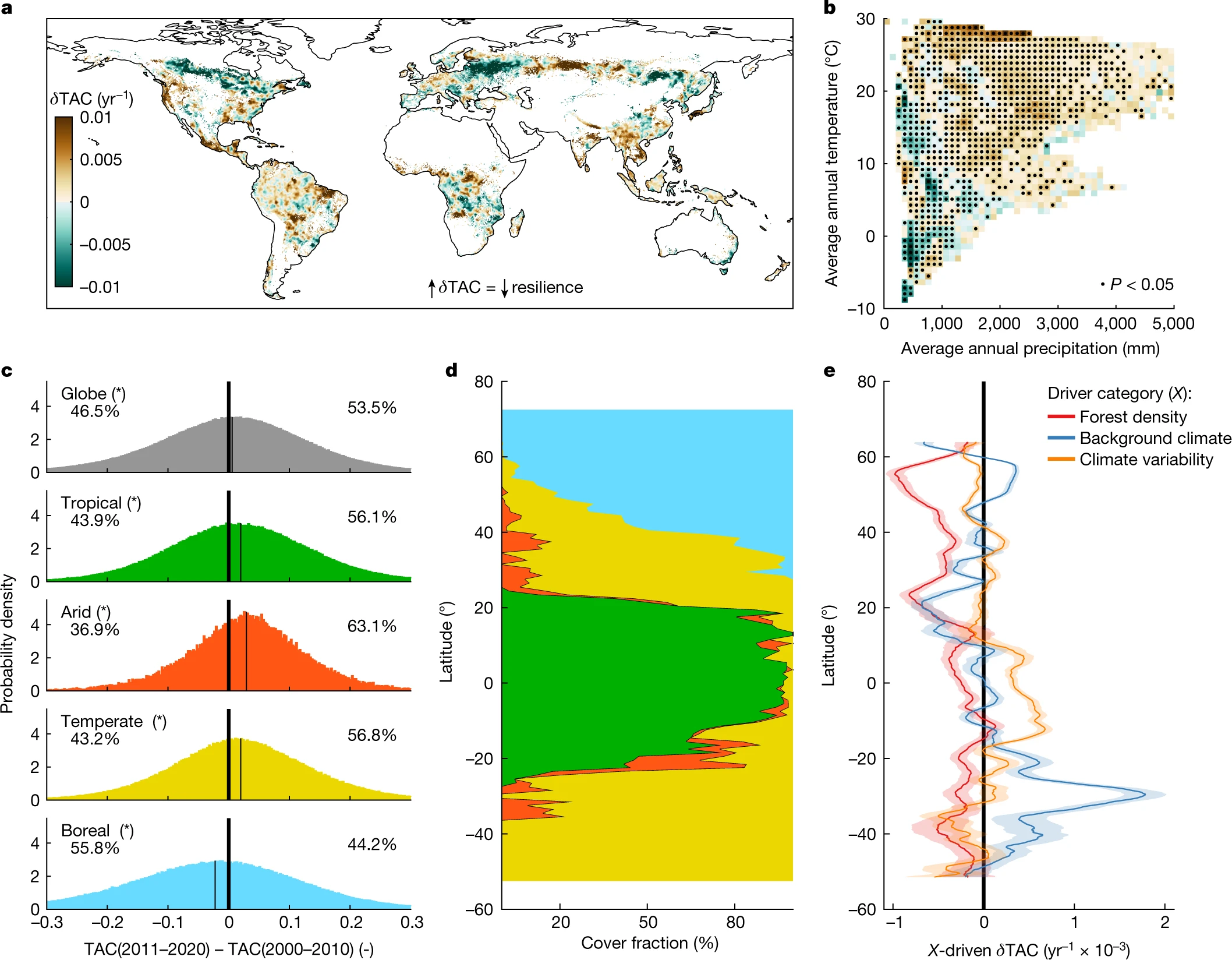
Temporal variations of forest resilience and its key drivers

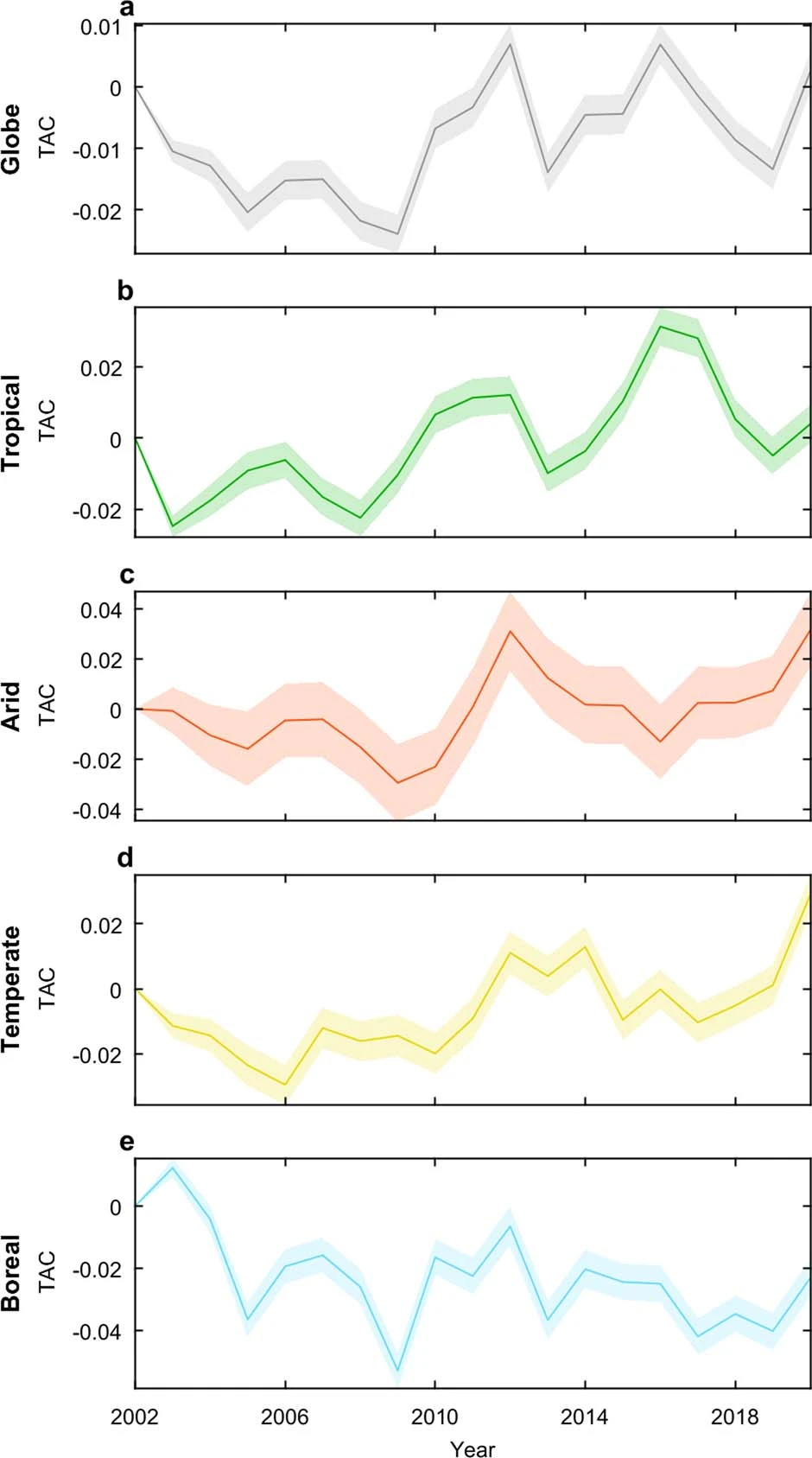
Emerging signals of declining forest resilience under climate change

Significant efforts have been made to identify early-warning signals of critical transitions. Systems approaching a bifurcation point show a characteristic behaviour called critical slowing down leading to an increasingly slow recovery from perturbations. This, in turn, may lead to an increase in (spatial or temporal) autocorrelation and variance, while variance spectra tend to lower frequencies, and the 'direction of critical slowing down' in a system's state space may be indicative of a system's future state when delayed negative feedbacks leading to oscillatory or other complex dynamics are weak. Researchers have explored early-warning signals in lakes, climate dynamics, the Amazon rainforest, forests worldwide, food webs, dry-land transitions and epilepsy attacks.

==== Examples ====
Studies show that more than three-quarters of Amazon rainforest has been losing resilience since the early 2000s as measured by CSD and that tropical, arid and temperate forests are substantially losing resilience. It has been proposed that a loss of resilience in forests "can be detected from the increased temporal autocorrelation (TAC) in the state of the system, reflecting a decline in recovery rates due to the critical slowing down (CSD) of system processes that occur at thresholds".

=== Flickering ===
The above approach (looking for critical slow down) is how most researchers assess if a critical transition is imminent. However, in highly stochastic (random) systems, alternative basins of attraction will be reached well before bifurcation points are reached. Perturbations might therefore cause the system to 'flicker' between the basins of attraction.

==== Examples ====
This idea has gained considerable interest in the last few years, somewhat entering the mainstream. The idea has been applied widely, to studies of ecological resilience (such as eutrophication of a lake) and to larger systems such as the potential collapse of the Atlantic Meridional Overturning Circulation.

== See also ==
- Tipping points in the climate system
- Deforestation and climate change
- Ecological resilience
- Ecological threshold
- Ecosystem collapse
- Cascade effect (ecology)
- Percolation theory
