= Discrete modelling =

Discrete modelling is the discrete analogue of continuous modelling. In discrete modelling, formulae are fit to discrete data—data that could potentially take on only a countable set of values, such as the integers, and which are not infinitely divisible. A common method in this form of modelling is to use recurrence relations.

Discrete time models are well-suited for step-by-step computer simulations and are often appropriate for modelling experimental data, which is typically collected in discrete form.
