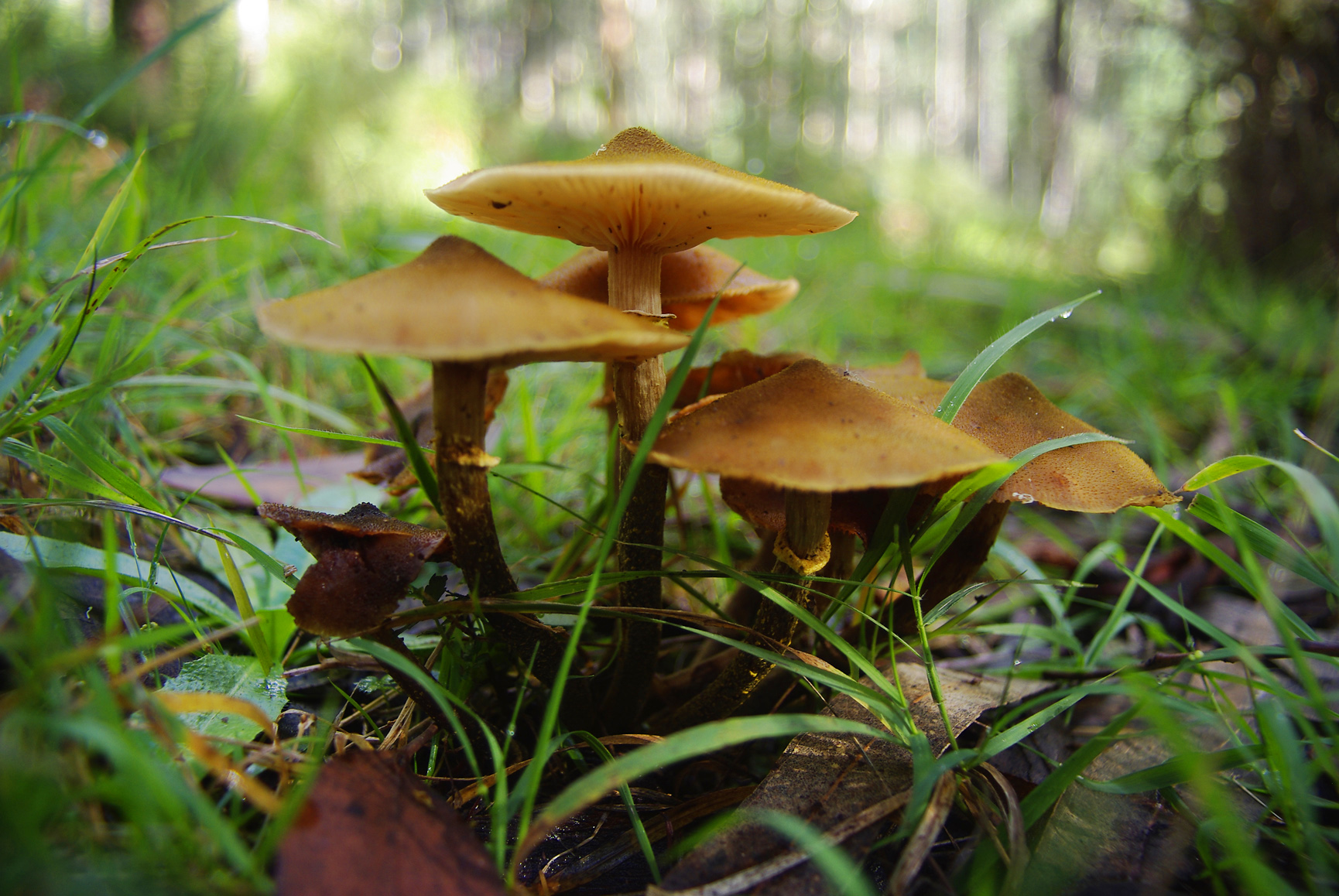

Scientific classification
- Kingdom: Fungi
- Division: Basidiomycota
- Class: Agaricomycetes
- Order: Agaricales
- Family: Physalacriaceae
- Genus: Armillaria
- Species: A. luteobubalina

Binomial name
- Armillaria luteobubalina Watling & Kile (1978)

= Armillaria luteobubalina =

Species of fungus in the family Physalacriaceae

Armillaria luteobubalina
- Mycological characteristics
- Gills on hymenium
- Cap is convex or flat
- Hymenium is sinuate
- Stipe has a ring
- Spore print is white
- Ecology is parasitic
- Edibility is edible

Armillaria luteobubalina, commonly known as the Australian honey fungus, is a species of root rot fungus in the family Physalacriaceae.

It was first described in 1978, after having been discovered several years earlier growing in a Eucalyptus plantation in southeastern Australia. It distinguished itself from other known Australian Armillaria species by its aggressive pathogenicity. It may take years for infected trees to show signs of disease, leading to an underestimation of disease prevalence. Studies show that the spread of disease in eucalypt forests is associated with infected stumps left following logging operations. Although several methods have been suggested to control the spread of disease, they are largely economically or environmentally unfeasible. Phylogenetic analyses have determined that A. luteobubalina is closely related to A. montagnei and that both of these species are in turn closely related to the Brazilian species A. paulensis. The distribution of A. luteobubalina suggests that it is an ancient species that originated before the separation of the precursor supercontinent Gondwana.

The fruit bodies have cream- to tan-coloured caps that grow up to 10 cm (4 in) in diameter and stems that measure up to 20 cm (8 in) long by 1.5 cm (1 in) thick. Widely distributed in southern Australia, the fungus is responsible for a disease known as Armillaria root rot, a primary cause of Eucalyptus tree death and forest dieback. It is the most pathogenic and widespread of the six Armillaria species found in Australia. The fungus has also been collected in Argentina and Chile. It appears at the base of infected trees and other woody plants in autumn (March–April). The fungus is dispersed through spores produced on gills on the underside of the caps, and also by growing vegetatively through the root systems of host trees. The ability of the fungus to spread vegetatively is facilitated by an aerating system that allows it to efficiently diffuse oxygen through rhizomorphs—rootlike structures made of dense masses of hyphae. The fruit bodies are edible, but require cooking to remove the bitter taste.

== Taxonomy ==
Armillaria luteobubalina was first described in 1978 by mycologists Roy Watling and Glen Kile, who studied its effects on a fast-growing plantation of Eucalyptus regnans near Traralgon, Victoria. The plantation, established in 1963, consisted largely of trees with a mean height of about 25 m (80 ft). A cluster of dead and dying trees discovered in 1973 suggested attack by a virulent primary pathogen, that is, one capable of infecting a host before invasion by other, secondary pathogens. This finding was inconsistent with the pathogenic behaviour of the known Armillaria species in Australia at the time, A. mellea and A. elegans. Further study over the next few years showed that the fungus spread by the growth of underground mycelia in root systems, expanding outward from the initial infected stump at an average of 2.5 m (8.2 ft) per year. Most Australian records of Armillaria infections referred to A. mellea, based on the presence of black rhizomorphs. For over one hundred years, A. mellea was thought to be a pleiomorphic (occurring in various distinct forms) species with a widespread distribution and host range, and variable pathogenicity. which led to great confusion among taxonomists and plant pathologists alike. In 1973, Veikko Hintikka reported a technique to distinguish between Armillaria species by growing them together as single spore isolates on petri dishes and observing changes in the morphology of the cultures. Using similar techniques, mycologists eventually determined that the Armillaria mellea species complex in Europe and North America in fact consisted of five and ten distinct "biological species", respectively.

Watling and Kile compared the macroscopic and microscopic characters of the pathogenic Armillaria with A. polymyces (now known as A. obscura), A. mellea, A. limonea and A. novae-zelandiae and found sufficient differences between them to warrant designating the species as new. Its specific epithet is derived from the Latin lutea "yellow", and was chosen to highlight an important distinguishing characteristic: the strong yellow colour of the cap and lack of reddish or brown tones in the stem typical of other resident Armillaria.

A phylogenetic study of South American Armillaria species concluded that A. luteobubalina is in a lineage that includes A. montagnei, and these are sister to a lineage containing A. paulensis, a species known from a single specimen collected in São Paulo, Brazil. Although they are very similar, specimens of A. luteobubalina have smaller spores than Argentinian specimens of A. montagnei, and their distinctness is well-supported with phylogenetic analysis. Based on analysis of pectic enzymes, A. luteobubalina is closely related to A. limonea, a species found in New Zealand; this result corroborates phylogenetic analyses reported in 2003 and 2006. Molecular analysis of 27 collections of A. luteobubalina from southwest Western Australia and one from Traralgon revealed four distinct polymorphic groups. The genetic variety suggests it is native to Australia.

== Description ==
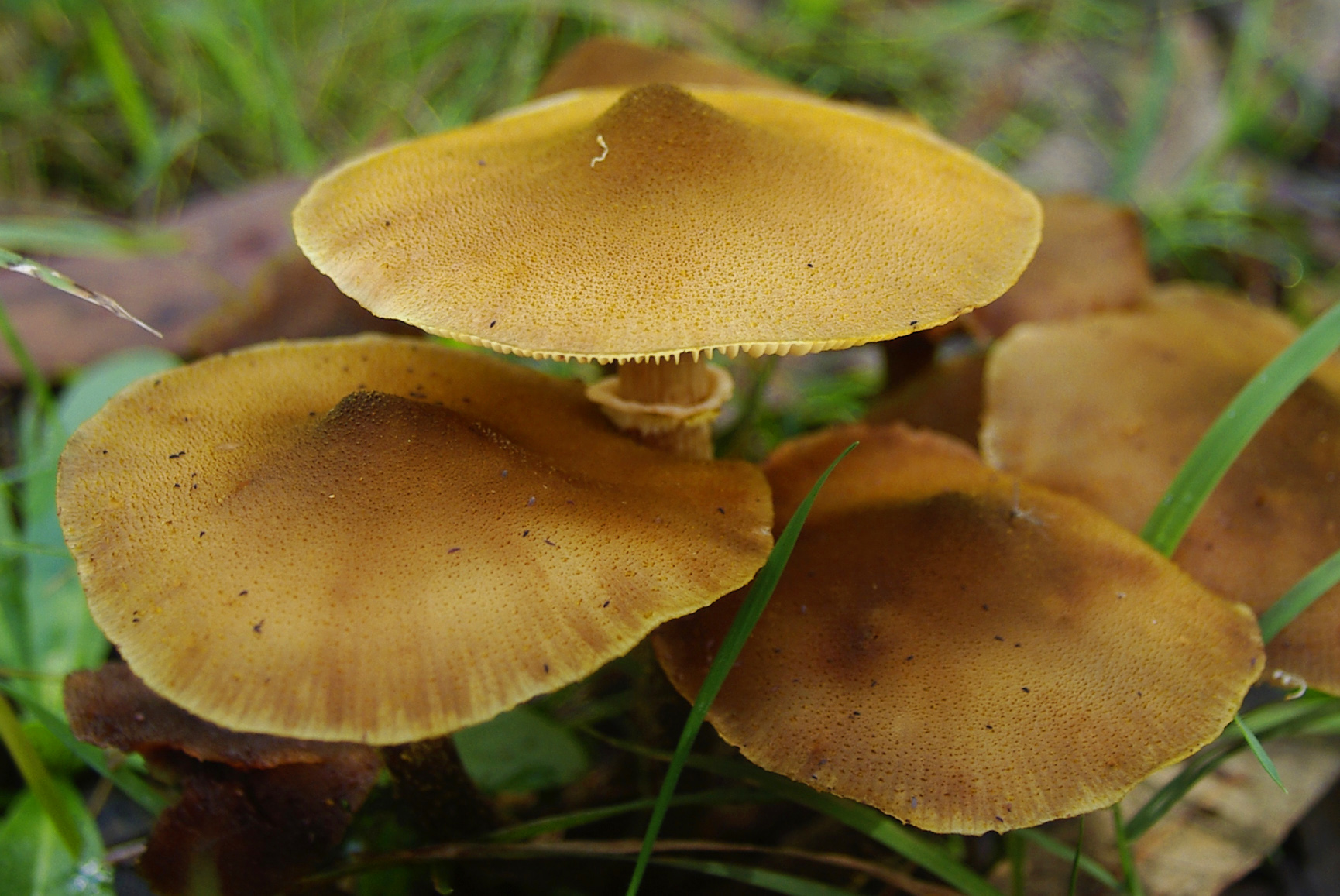
Mushroom caps are covered with tiny scales and have an umbo.

Up to 10 cm (4 in) in diameter, the cap is convex to flattened in shape with a central umbo (a rounded elevation) and is various shades of cream, yellow and tan. The cap surface is covered with darker scales and feels rough to the touch. The cap edge, or margin, is rolled inward in young specimens. The crowded gills are sinuate and white to cream in colour initially, brownish-cream or pinkish brown in maturity, and sometimes with yellow or rust-coloured marks close to the margins. The stem is central (that is, it joins the cap in the centre) and is up to 20 cm (8 in) long by 1.5 cm (1 in) thick. It is slightly thicker at its base than its apex, sometimes almost bulb-like. The stem surface is streaked with fibrils that run up and down its length. It has a floppy yellow wool-like ring which may develop irregular, jagged edges with time. The flesh is white, and in the stem has a woolly or stringy consistency.

=== Microscopic characteristics ===
The spore print is white when fresh, but becomes more cream-coloured when dry. The smooth spores are oval to ellipsoid, hyaline (translucent), non-amyloid (meaning they do not absorb iodine from Melzer's reagent), and typically measure 6.5–7.5 by 4.5–5.5 μm. The basidia (spore-bearing cells) are thin-walled, hyaline, and lack clamp connections at their bases. They are usually four-spored but occasionally two-spored, with sterigmata (projections that attach to the spores) up to 4 μm long. The cheilocystidia (cystidia that occur on the edge of a gill) are mostly club-shaped, thin-walled, hyaline, and measure 15–30 by 6–10 μm.

=== Similar species ===
Five other Armillaria species are found in Australia. Within the range of A. luteobubalina, A. hinnulea is restricted to gully habitats. A. fumosa is a rarer species found only in poorly drained or seasonally wet locations. A. luteobubalina and A. montagnei share cap features and a similar unpleasant flavour, but the latter species has an olive-tinged cap, larger spores (9.5–11 by 5.5–7 μm compared to 6.5–7.5 by 4.5–5.5 μm) and a more conspicuous annulus than those found in A. luteobubalina. The morphology of the vegetative structures of A. limonea is distinctly different than A. luteobubalina, and can be used to distinguish the two species. A. novae-zelandiae has a sticky more flattened cap and stem below the ring and is found in wet forests, and A. pallidula is a species with cream gills maturing to pale pink found in tropical Australia arising from dead tree stumps or the roots of dead or living trees. A. luteobubalina is the only Armillaria species which occurs in Western Australia. Distinguishing Australian species is economically important, because A. luteobubalina is more pathogenic than the other members of the genus. A molecular diagnostic test, developed in 2002, can accurately identify each species using DNA extracted from its mycelia. Before this, species identification was limited to times when fruit bodies were in season. This technology also revealed a variation in the molecular material of A. luteobubalina that suggested sexual reproduction.

== Habitat and distribution ==
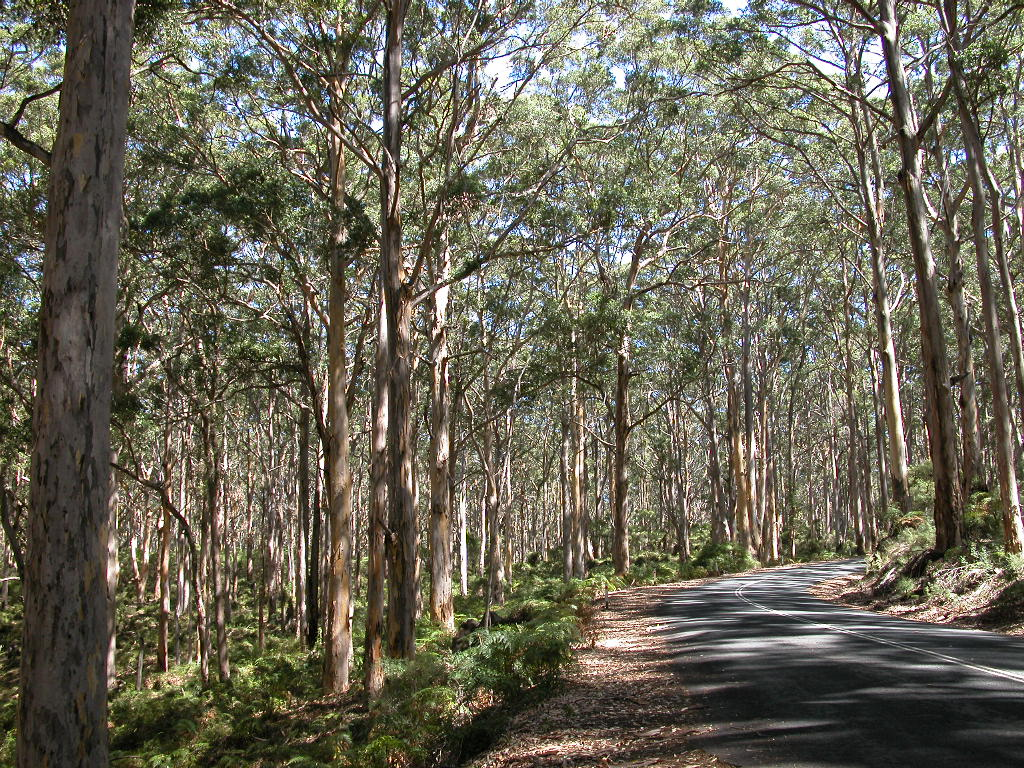
A. luteobubalina grows in karri forests, like this one in Pemberton, Western Australia.

Armillaria luteobubalina has been recorded in southeastern Australia, from the southeastern corner of Queensland through eastern New South Wales and across Victoria into southeastern South Australia. It also occurs in Tasmania and southwestern Western Australia. Those of the karri forests (consisting largely of the species E. diversicolor) of the southwest have paler and yellower caps than those in the jarrah forests (which contain predominantly Eucalyptus marginata) further north. The fruit bodies arise on wood, especially on stumps or around the base of trees, and often in huge numbers. They usually appear between April and July, although most production occurs in the second half of May. Abundant in woodlands, it can invade gardens and orchards, where it can attack many woody plants. The honey fungus infected and killed many plants near tuart trees (Eucalyptus gomphocephala) which had been cut down near Kings Park in suburban Perth. Armillaria luteobubalina is commonly found in eucalyptus forests in Australia, and is thought to be the most pathogenic and most widespread Armillaria species in the major western Australian forest types. The mushroom has also been reported from southern South America, in Argentina and Chile. A 2003 study of the molecular phylogenetics and pattern of its distribution in South America and Australia indicate that A. luteobubalina is an ancient species, originating before the separation of the precursor supercontinent Gondwana. Genetic differences between isolates in the South American and Australian populations indicate a long period of geographical separation, and the authors suggest that they "later might be regarded as independent taxa".

== Root rot ==
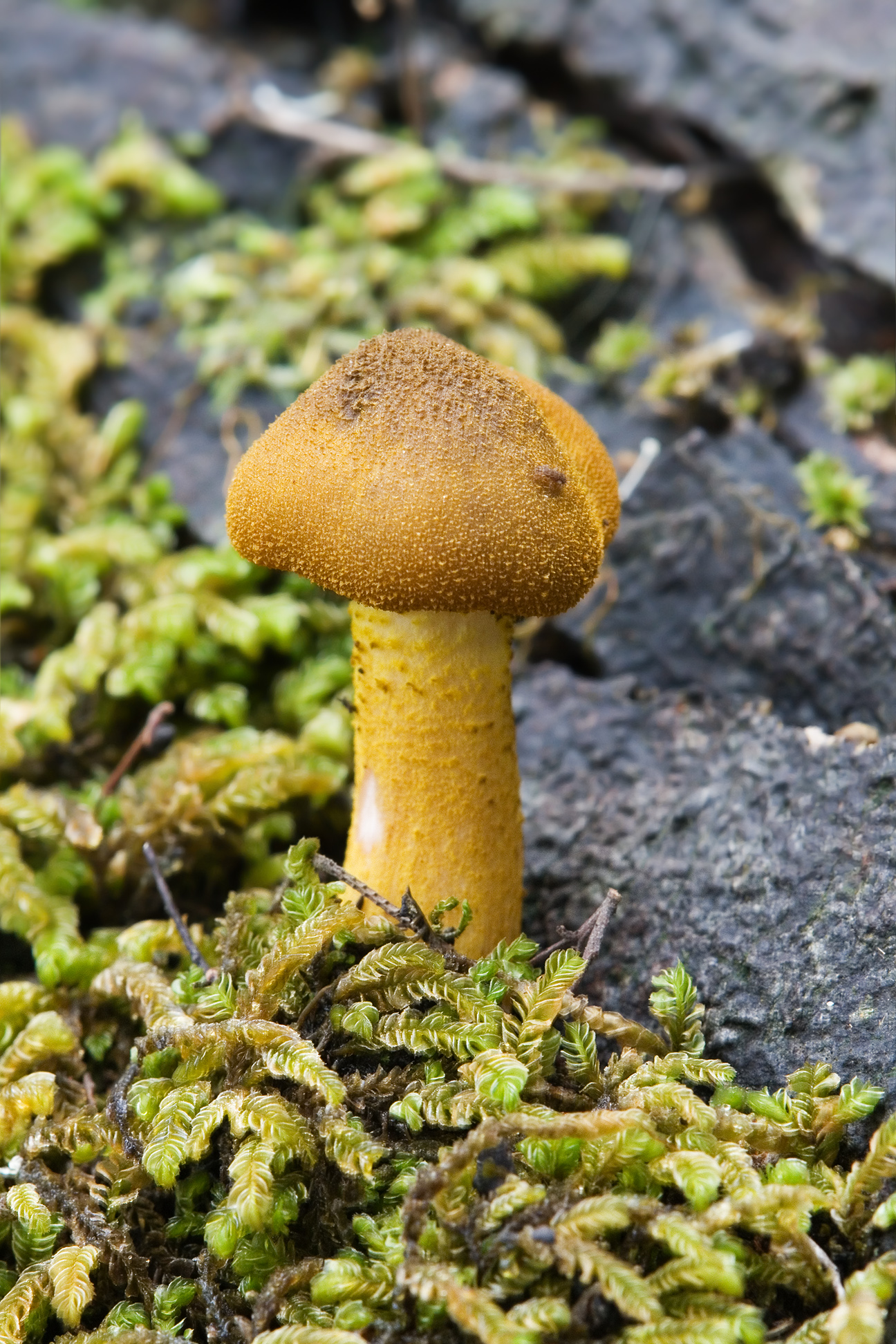
Young fruit body found in Wielangta forest in southeastern Tasmania, Australia

=== Appearance of infected trees ===
Trees that are infected by A. luteobubalina show characteristic symptoms both above and below ground. Above the ground, the base of the tree develops inverted V-shaped lesions, and the infected wood undergoes white rot, a fungal wood decay process where the cellulose and lignin of the sapwood are both broken down, leaving the wood stringy. The bark of the stem dies and becomes discoloured up to 3 m (10 ft) above the ground. Clusters of fruit bodies appear at the base of the tree in autumn. Crowns may show gradual deterioration, or tree death may occur suddenly. Below the ground, characteristic symptoms of infections include rotting the ends of tree roots, white-rotted sapwood, and the presence of fan-shaped areas of white mycelium below dead or infected bark.

=== Occurrence ===
In selectively logged eucalypt forests in the central highlands of Victoria, it has been estimated that about 3–5% of the forest area is "moderately to severely affected" by Armillaria root rot caused by A. luteobubalina. A review of eucalypt plantations planted in New South Wales from 1994 to 2005 found that infection by A. luteobubalina was rare, and only accounted for 1% of mortality in total. In this instance, the cases had been restricted to Eucalyptus nitens on the Dorrigo Plateau. Unlike other Armillaria species found in Australia's native forests, which require a host tree to become weakened by prior infection by a different species, A. luteobubalina is a primary pathogen, and can infect healthy trees. Tree roots may be infected for years before showing above-ground symptoms, making it difficult to accurately assess the true extent of disease in a forest stand. Surveys are usually conducted in autumn, to coincide with the appearance of fruit bodies; infection is assessed by the presence of basal scars on the trees, and the appearance of fruit bodies. Several factors, however—such as cost, variable on-site conditions, and non-symptomatic diseased trees—make it difficult for such surveys to reliably detect all infections. One study showed that above-ground examinations detected only 50% of the trees actually infected, leading to underestimation of the incidence of true infection by 20–40%. The study used more intensive surveying methods to determine that 25- to 30-year-old karri regrowth forests in western Australia showed an average of 40–45% incidence of infection.

=== Disease spread ===
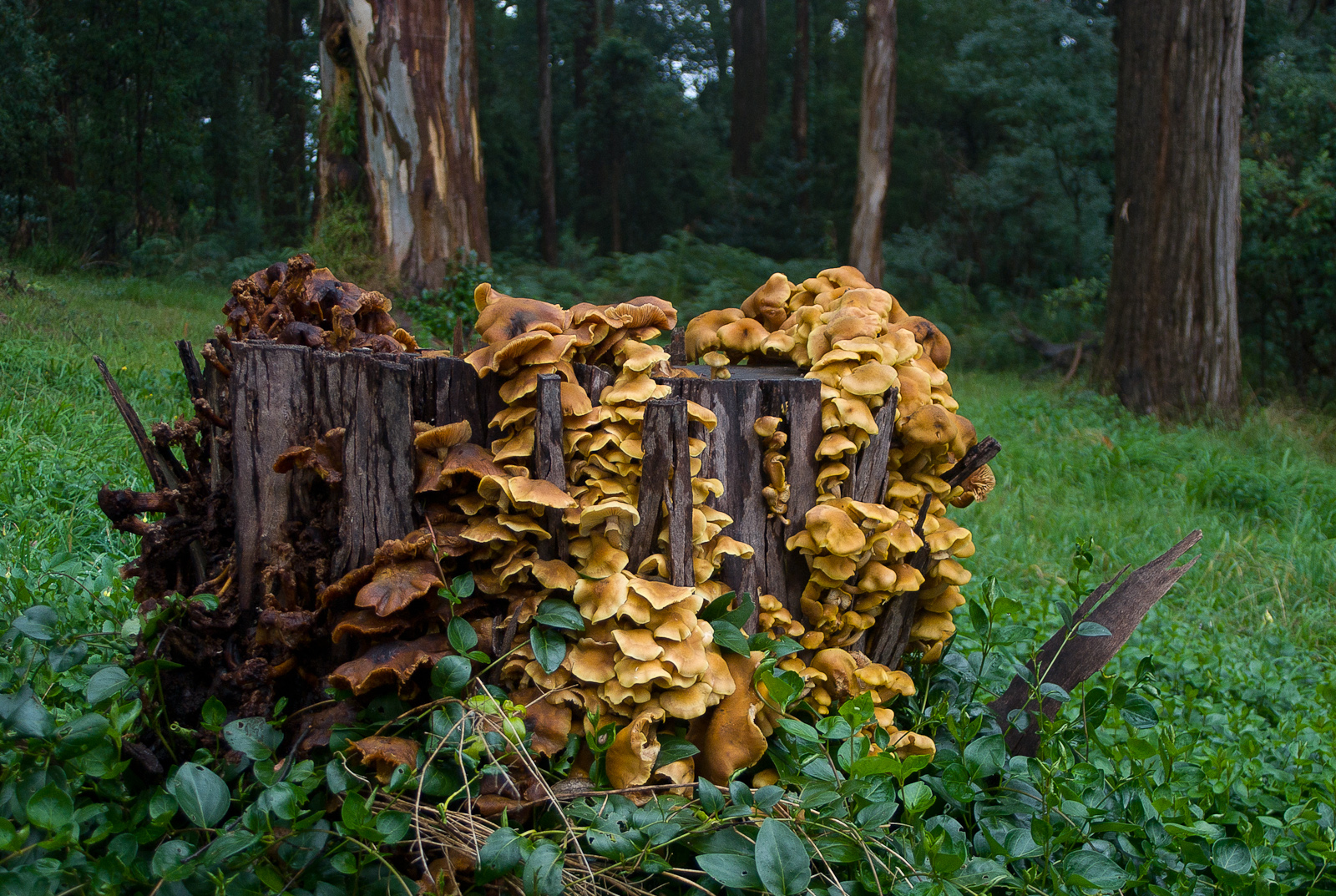
A dense cluster of fruit bodies growing on a rotting stump

Several studies have shown that the spread of Armillaria root rot in eucalypt forests is associated with infected stumps that remain after an area has been logged. Armillaria luteobubalina can persist on these stumps, using them as a source of food for up to 25 or more years. In one case reported in Ovens, Victoria, the disease was spread to blueberry plants (Vaccinium species) via buried fragments of infected Eucalyptus that remained following preparation of the previously forested site for planting. In individual forest stands, fungal infection is usually found in discrete disease patches separated by stands of healthy trees—a discontinuous distribution. Large-scale aerial photography can be used to identify regions of forest infected by the species. The species also causes damage to trees and bushes in coastal dune woodlands, shrubland, and heath communities. It can be found on a wide range of hosts, but is most commonly associated with (in order of decreasing frequency) jarrah (Eucalyptus marginata), bull banksia (Banksia grandis), marri (E. calophylla), Lasiopetalum floribundum, and Acacia saligna. It has also infected scattered populations of wandoo (E. wandoo). The fungus has also been reported to infect Nothofagus species in Argentina, and Pinus radiata in Chile.

Armillaria luteobubalina uses "an elaborate, sophisticated aeration system" that enables it to efficiently deliver oxygen into the rhizomorphs, helping it thrive in low-oxygen environments. When grown in culture, the mycelium develops into a continuous region of tissue with a perforated crust. This tissue is hydrophobic and resistant to becoming waterlogged. Rhizomorphs develop beneath clusters of so-called "air-pores" near the perforations. These gas spaces connect the atmosphere with the central canal of the rhizomorph, to facilitate diffusion of oxygen and satiate the organism's high oxygen requirement during growth. This aeration system is thought to be an important factor in the organism's pathogenicity, allowing it to grow on wet or waterlogged root surfaces and send hyphae or rhizomorphs into live roots or cut stumps, where conditions may be hypoxic. The rhizomorphs have a dichotomous branching pattern, so that they split or bifurcate at various intervals. Experiments and field observations have shown that this allows the fungus to be a more aggressive and virulent pathogen than Armillaria species whose rhizomorphs branch monopodially (where lateral branches grow from a main stem). Although the structure of A. luteobubalina rhizomorphs is specialised for spread in potentially anaerobic conditions, the soil mycelium is adaptive and can amplify the absorptive surface of peripheral hyphae in response to the presence of nutrient-rich soil.

=== Control ===
Methods for controlling the spread of Armillaria root rot include physical removal of infected trees, stumps and large roots; fumigation of soil around infected hosts; and injection of fumigants directly into infected hosts. These methods are often not practical due to high cost, introduction of toxic chemicals that affect other organisms, or health and safety issues for the operator. Biological control is another method that has been investigated to control root rot caused by A. luteobubalina. In one study, thinning stumps of Eucalyptus diversicolor were simultaneously inoculated with A. luteobubalina and one of the saprobic wood decay fungi Coriolus versicolor, Stereum hirsutum and Xylaria hypoxylon; all three fungi significantly reduced infection by A. luteobubalinea. These results were echoed in another study of stumps in karri regrowth forests, where it was shown that the presence of other wood decay fungi suppressed the growth of A. luteobubalina on the stump base.

== Uses ==
Although it has a hot-bitter taste, the species is edible, and cooking removes the bitterness.

== See also ==
- List of Armillaria species
