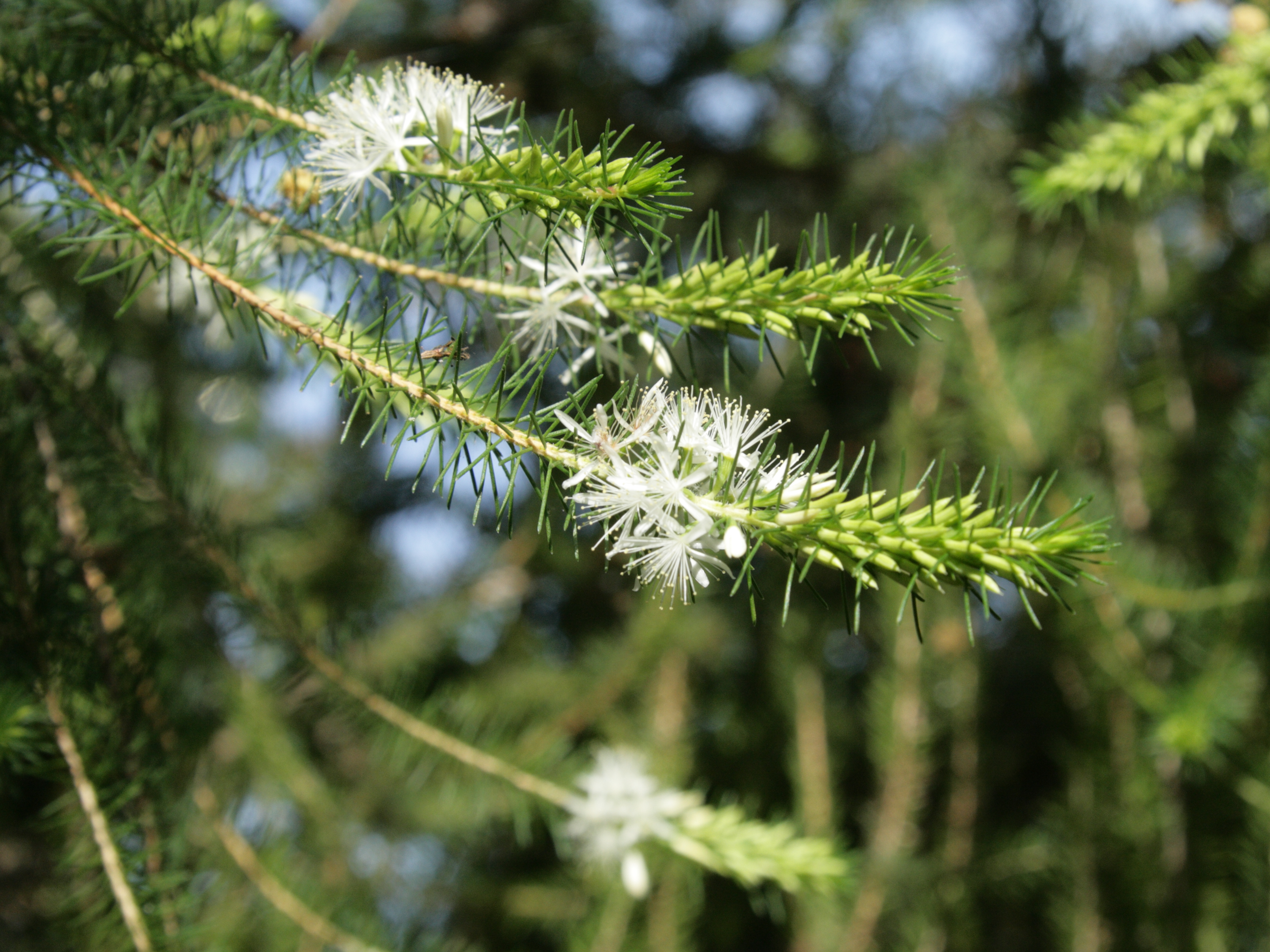
- Foliage and flowers

Scientific classification
- Kingdom: Plantae
- Clade: Tracheophytes
- Clade: Angiosperms
- Clade: Eudicots
- Clade: Rosids
- Order: Myrtales
- Family: Myrtaceae
- Genus: Calytrix
- Species: C. acutifolia

Binomial name
- Calytrix acutifolia (Lindl.) Craven

Synonyms
- Calytrix sp. Scarp (H.Bowler 270) WA Herbarium; Lhotskya acutifolia Lindl.

= Calytrix acutifolia =

Species of flowering plant

Calytrix acutifolia is a species of flowering plant in the myrtle family Myrtaceae and is endemic to south-west of Western Australia. It is a slender, openly-branched shrub with linear to lance-shaped leaves and clusters of white, cream-coloured or yellow flowers with 40 to 85 white stamens in several rows.

== Description ==
Calytrix acutifolia is a slender, openly-branched shrub that typically grows to a height of up to 2 m (6 ft 7 in), and has linear to lance-shaped leaves 2.5–15 mm (0.098–0.591 in) long and 0.5–1.0 mm (0.020–0.039 in) wide on a petiole 0.5–1.25 mm (0.020–0.049 in) long. There is usually a stipule up to 0.75 mm (0.030 in) long at the base of the petiole. The flowers are arranged singly in leaf axils with green to light brown bracteoles 3–5 mm (0.12–0.20 in) long. The floral tube is more or less cylindrical, with 5 to 7 ribs and 3.5–4.5 mm (0.14–0.18 in) long. The sepals are glabrous, 1.0–2.3 mm (0.039–0.091 in) long and lack an awn. The petals are white, 7.5–10 mm (0.30–0.39 in) long and 2.0–2.5 mm (0.079–0.098 in) wide and there are 40 to 85 cream to light yellow stamens in 2 to 4 rows. Flowering occurs between April and December with a peak from mid-October to early November.

== Taxonomy ==
This species was first described in 1839 by John Lindley who gave it the name Lhotskya acutifolia in his A Sketch of the Vegetation of the Swan River Colony. In 1987, Lyndley Craven transferred the species to Calytrix as C. acutifolia in the journal Brunonia. The specific epithet (acutifolia) means "sharply pointed leaves".

== Distribution and habitat ==
Calytrix acutifolia grows on hill slopes and gullies in wandoo and marri woodlands on the escarpment of the Darling Range and Pinjarra plain in the Jarrah Forest and Swan Coastal Plain bioregions of south-western Western Australia.

== Conservation status ==
This species is listed as "not threatened" by the Government of Western Australia Department of Biodiversity, Conservation and Attractions.
