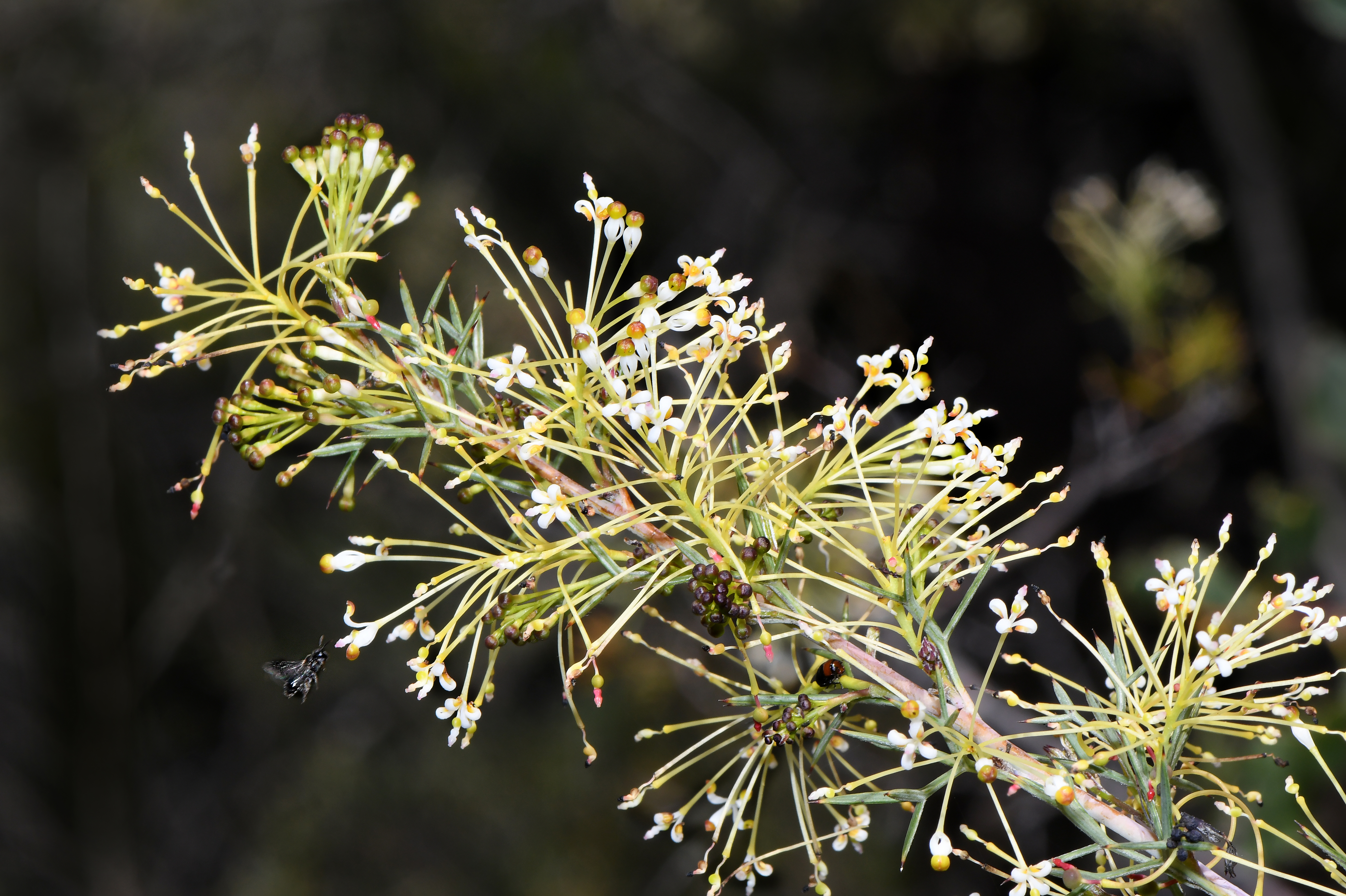

Scientific classification
- Kingdom: Plantae
- Clade: Embryophytes
- Clade: Tracheophytes
- Clade: Angiosperms
- Clade: Eudicots
- Order: Proteales
- Family: Proteaceae
- Genus: Grevillea
- Species: G. hortiorum

Binomial name
- Grevillea hortiorum Olde

= Grevillea hortiorum =

Species of flowering plant

Grevillea hortiorum is a species of plant in the protea family and is endemic to the south-west of Western Australia. It is an erect, open shrub with divided leaves with linear lobes, and clusters of white flowers.

== Description ==
Grevillea hortiorum is an erect, open shrub typically 0.7–3 m (2 ft 4 in – 9 ft 10 in) high and 1.0–1.3 m (3 ft 3 in – 4 ft 3 in) wide and has a smooth, grey trunk. The leaves are 10–30 mm (0.39–1.18 in) long and wide in outline, and divided with up to five lobes, often divided again, the end lobes linear, 5–10 mm (0.20–0.39 in) long and 0.5–0.8 mm (0.020–0.031 in) wide and sharply pointed. The flowers are arranged in sometimes branched clusters, each cluster more or less spherical or shortly cylindrical with 18 to 22 flowers on a rachis 15–17 mm (0.59–0.67 in) long. The flowers are white, the pistil 4.0–4.5 mm (0.16–0.18 in) long. Flowering mainly occurs from late winter to spring and the fruit is an oblong follicle 8–10 mm (0.31–0.39 in) long.

== Taxonomy ==
Grevillea hortiorum was first formally described in 2021 by Peter M. Olde in the journal Telopea from specimens collected by Fred Hort in the Gunapin State Forest near York in 1998. The specific epithet (hortiorum) honours amateur botanists and plant collectors Frederick and Jean Hort, who were instrumental in the discovery of this species.

== Distribution and habitat ==
The species grows in open marri and wandoo woodland, sometimes in heath and thick scrub on granitic sandy, clay-loam with or over laterite. It occurs in scattered locations near York and Bindoon in the IBRA bioregions of Avon Wheatbelt and Jarrah Forest in south-west Western Australia.

== Conservation status ==
This species is listed as 'not threatened' by the Government of Western Australia Department of Biodiversity, Conservation and Attractions.
