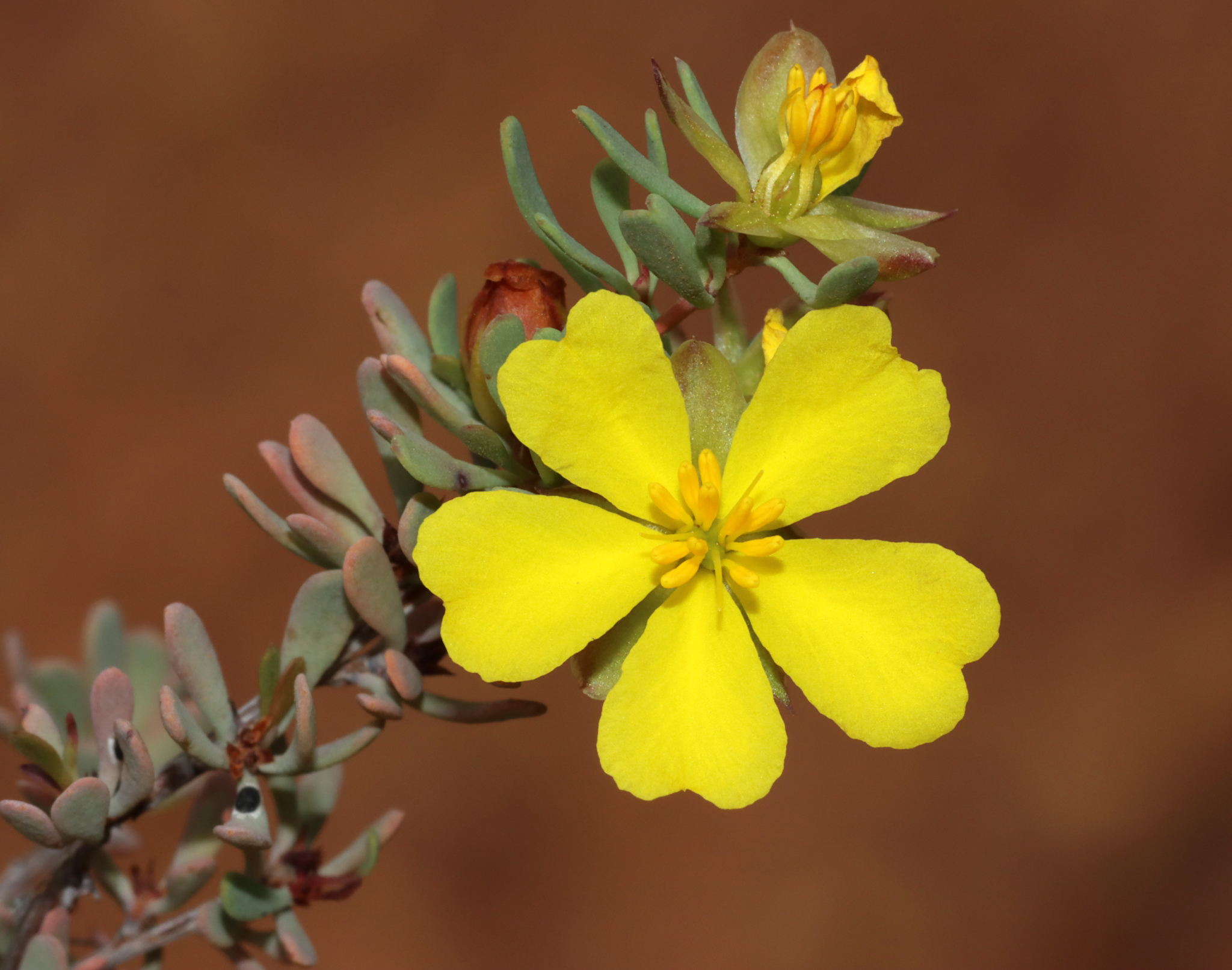
- Near Beverley

Scientific classification
- Kingdom: Plantae
- Clade: Tracheophytes
- Clade: Angiosperms
- Clade: Eudicots
- Order: Dilleniales
- Family: Dilleniaceae
- Genus: Hibbertia
- Species: H. glomerata

Binomial name
- Hibbertia glomerata Benth.

= Hibbertia glomerata =

Species of flowering plant

Hibbertia glomerata is a species of flowering plant in the family Dilleniaceae and is endemic to the south-west of Western Australia. It is a much-branched shrub with mostly oblong or egg-shaped to elliptic leaves and yellow flowers borne on the ends of short side shoots, with nine to twelve stamens, sometimes in groups of three, arranged around the three carpels.

== Description ==
Hibbertia glomerata is a much-branched shrub that typically grows to a height of 0.5–1.0 m (1 ft 8 in – 3 ft 3 in), the branchlets with prominent leaf scars. The leaves are spirally arranged and mostly oblong or egg-shaped to elliptic, 3–12 mm (0.12–0.47 in) long, 1.5–7 mm (0.059–0.276 in) wide and more or less glabrous. The flowers are arranged singly on short side-shoots and are 10–15 mm (0.39–0.59 in) wide and sessile, usually with three egg-shaped bracts 0.5–1.5 mm (0.020–0.059 in) long at the base of the flower. The five sepals are joined at the base, elliptic and 5–7 mm (0.20–0.28 in) long and the five petals are yellow, egg-shaped with the narrower end towards the base and 5–10 mm (0.20–0.39 in) long with a notch at the tip. There are ten to twelve stamens, either free from each other or in groups of three, arranged around the three glabrous carpels, each carpel containing one ovule.

== Taxonomy ==
Hibbertia glomerata was first formally described in 1863 by George Bentham in Flora Australiensis from specimens collected by James Drummond from the Swan River Colony. The specific epithet (glomerata) means"collected into heads", referring to the flowers.

In 2002, Judy Wheeler described four subspecies and the names are accepted by the Australian Plant Census:

- Hibbertia glomerata subsp. darlingensis J.R.Wheeler has eleven stamens, nine of them in three groups, all leaves oblong to elliptic, glabrous and 1.5–4 mm (0.059–0.157 in) wide and flowers mainly from August to October;
- Hibbertia glomerata subsp. ginginensis J.R.Wheeler has eleven stamens, nine of them in three groups, some leaves oblong to elliptic, glabrous and 1.5–4 mm (0.059–0.157 in) wide, floral leaves 2.5–6.5 mm (0.098–0.256 in) wide and flowers from July to September;
- Hibbertia glomerata Benth. subsp. glomerata has ten to twelve stamens mostly free from each other, some leaves oblong to elliptic, glabrous and 1.5–4 mm (0.059–0.157 in) wide and floral leaves egg-shaped to elliptic and usually with wavy edges. and mostly flowers from September to November;
- Hibbertia glomerata subsp. wandoo J.R.Wheeler has ten to twelve stamens mostly free from each other, all leaves are narrow egg-shaped with the narrower end towards the base, the outer sepals shorter than the inner sepals, and mostly flowers from August to October.

== Distribution and habitat ==
This hibbertia grows occurs in the Jarrah Forest and Swan Coastal Plain biogeographic regions of south-western Western Australia. Subspecies darlingensis is found in forest and woodland, sometimes on roadside reserves, on the Darling Scarp, mainly near Perth. Subspecies ginginensis occurs in woodland and forest mainly on roadsides near Gingin. The autonym glomerata is found in a variety of habitats in the south-west of Western Australia and subsp. wandoo is restricted to an area near Beverley where it grows in wandoo woodland.

== Conservation status ==
Hibbertia glomerata is classified as "not threatened" by the Government of Western Australia Department of Parks and Wildlife, but subsp. ginginensis is classified as "Priority Two" meaning that it is poorly known and from only one or a few locations and subsp. wandoo as "Priority Three" meaning that it is poorly known and known from only a few locations but is not under imminent threat.

== See also ==
- List of Hibbertia species
