= Acacia ataxiphylla =

Large-fruited Tammin wattle

Conservation status
- Near Threatened (IUCN 3.1)

Scientific classification
- Kingdom: Plantae
- Clade: Tracheophytes
- Clade: Angiosperms
- Clade: Eudicots
- Clade: Rosids
- Order: Fabales
- Family: Fabaceae
- Subfamily: Caesalpinioideae
- Clade: Mimosoid clade
- Genus: Acacia
- Species: A. ataxiphylla

Binomial name
- Acacia ataxiphylla Benth.
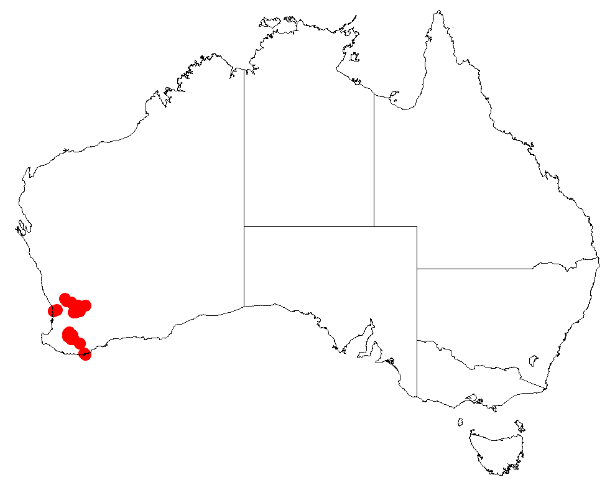
- Acacia ataxiphylla occurrence data from Australasian Virtual Herbarium

Synonyms
- Racosperma ataxiphyllum (Benth.) Pedley

Species of legume

Acacia ataxiphylla, commonly known as large-fruited Tammin wattle, is a species of flowering plant in the family Fabaceae and is endemic to the south-west of Western Australia. It is a prostrate shrub with linear phyllodes, spherical to slightly oblong heads of yellow flowers, and curved, narrowly oblong pods up to 20 mm (0.79 in) long.

== Description ==
Acacia ataxiphylla is a prostrate to spreading shrub or subshrub that typically grows to a height of 15–60 cm (5.9–23.6 in). Its phyllodes are linear, continuous with the branchlets but lack wings, sometimes pentagonal in cross-section, straight to curved, 15–60 mm (0.59–2.36 in) long, 1–2 mm (0.039–0.079 in) wide and with a hooked or shallowly turned down tip. There are linear stipules 2–3 mm (0.079–0.118 in) long at the base of the phyllodes. The flowers are borne in a spherical to slightly oblong head 4–6 mm (0.16–0.24 in) diameter in axils on a peduncle 4–12 mm (0.16–0.47 in) long with 15 to 20 yellow flowers in each head. Flowering time varies with subspecies and the pods are narrowly oblong and curved, reddish-brown, up to 20 mm (0.79 in) long and 4 mm (0.16 in) wide.

== Taxonomy ==
Acacia ataxiphylla was first formally described in 1855 by George Bentham in the journal Linnaea: Ein Journal für die Botanik in ihrem ganzen Umfange, oder Beiträge zur Pflanzenkunde from specimens collected by James Drummond. The specific epithet (ataxiphylla) means 'disordered-leaved', probably referring to the "strongly hooked phyllodes, that give plant a somewhat tangled aspect".

In 1999, Bruce Maslin described two subspecies of Acacia ataxiphylla in the journal Nuytsia, and the names are accepted by the Australian Plant Census:

- Acacia ataxiphylla Benth. subsp. ataxiphylla has flower heads about 5 mm (0.20 in) in diameter, peduncles 8–12 mm (0.31–0.47 in) long and 0.4 mm (0.016 in) wide, and flowers from November to December or January.
- Acacia ataxiphylla subsp. magna Maslin has flower heads 7–9 mm (0.28–0.35 in) in diameter, peduncles 4–7 mm (0.16–0.28 in) long and 0.7–0.8 mm (0.028–0.031 in) wide, and flowers in June and July.

== Distribution and habitat ==
This species of wattle is scattered and infrequent in the Avon Wheatbelt and Jarrah Forest bioregions of south-western of Western Australia. Subspecies ataxiphylla grows in wandoo and jarra woodland within 30 km (19 mi) north and west of Kojonup. subspecies magna in low heath and is apparently restricted to the Tammin area.

== Conservation status ==
Acacia ataxiphylla is listed as "not threatened", but subsp. ataxiphylla is listed as "Priority Three" , meaning that it is poorly known and known from only a few locations but is not under imminent threat, and subsp. magna is listed as "Threatened Flora (Declared Rare Flora — Extant)" by the Government of Western Australia Department of Biodiversity, Conservation and Attractions.

== See also ==
- List of Acacia species
