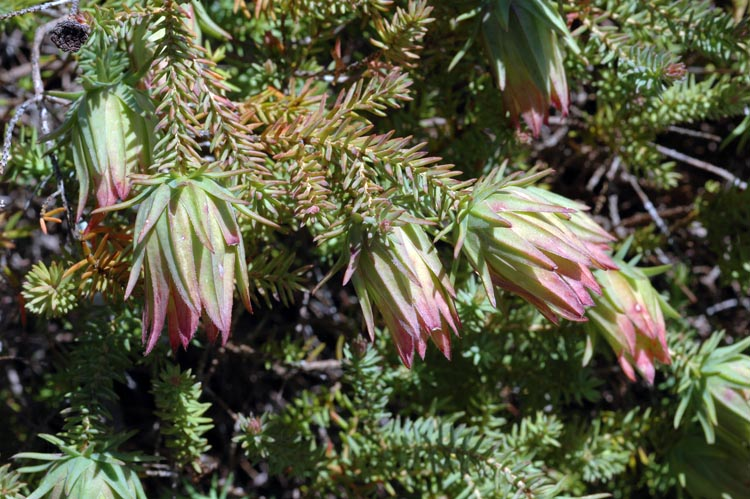

Scientific classification
- Kingdom: Plantae
- Clade: Tracheophytes
- Clade: Angiosperms
- Clade: Eudicots
- Clade: Rosids
- Order: Myrtales
- Family: Myrtaceae
- Genus: Darwinia
- Species: D. oederoides

Binomial name
- Darwinia oederoides (Turcz.) Benth.
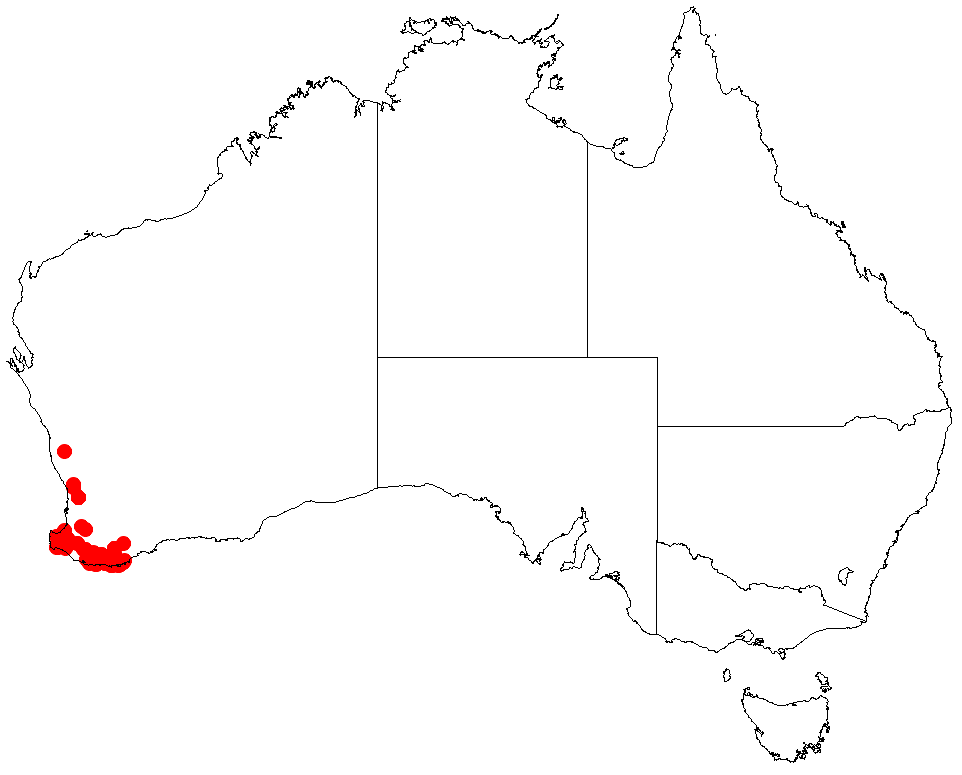
- Occurrence data from AVH

Synonyms
- Genetyllis oederoides Turcz.

= Darwinia oederoides =

Species of flowering plant

Darwinia oederoides is a species of flowering plant in the family Myrtaceae and is endemic to the south-west of Western Australia. It is a low, spreading shrub with linear leaves and clusters of pendent flowers surrounded by red and yellow bracts.

== Description ==
Darwinia oederoides is a spreading shrub that typically grows to a height of 10–30 cm (3.9–11.8 in). It has scattered linear leaves that are triangular to round in cross-section and 4–6 mm (0.16–0.24 in) long. The flowers are arranged in clusters of about 4 surrounded by narrow red and yellow bracts nearly 25 mm (0.98 in) long. Flowering occurs from October to January.

This species is similar in appearance to the endangered species Darwinia whicherensis.

== Taxonomy ==
The species was first formally described in 1849 by Nikolai Turczaninow who gave it the name Genetyllis oederoides and published the description in Bulletin de la Société Impériale des Naturalistes de Moscou. In 1865, George Bentham changed the name to Darwinia oederoides in The Journal of the Linnean Society, Botany. The specific epithet (oederoides) means "Oedera-like".

== Distribution and habitat ==
Darwinia oederoides is often found in wet depressions and along watercourses in the Esperance Plains, Jarrah Forest, Mallee, Swan Coastal Plain and Warren bioregions of Western Australia where it grows in sandy soils.
