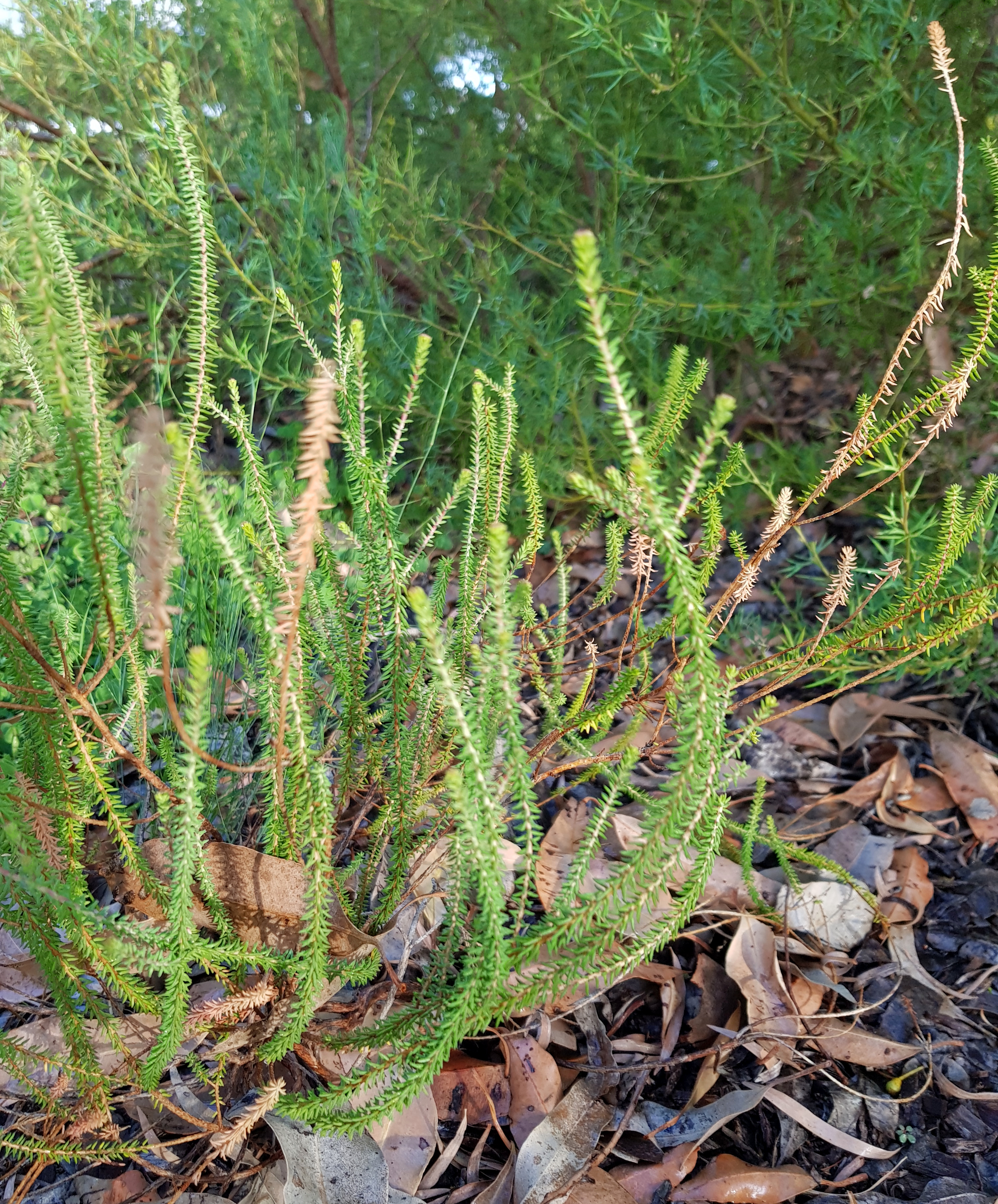

Conservation status
- Endangered (EPBC Act)

Scientific classification
- Kingdom: Plantae
- Clade: Tracheophytes
- Clade: Angiosperms
- Clade: Eudicots
- Clade: Rosids
- Order: Myrtales
- Family: Myrtaceae
- Genus: Darwinia
- Species: D. whicherensis

Binomial name
- Darwinia whicherensis Keighery

= Darwinia whicherensis =

Abba bell

Species of flowering plant

Darwinia whicherensis, commonly known as the Abba bell, is a plant in the myrtle family Myrtaceae and is endemic to the south-west of Western Australia. It is a small shrub with linear leaves and bell-shaped, flower-like inflorescences containing more than twenty flowers surrounded by bracts, the largest of which are red with green edges.

== Description ==
Darwinia whicherensis is an erect or spreading shrub which grows to a height of 700 mm (30 in), a width of 400 mm (20 in) and often uses surrounding vegetation for support. Its leaves are green, linear in shape, triangular in cross-section, 2–4 mm (0.08–0.2 in) long, often crowded at the end of branches and can bend backwards. The flowers are arranged in groups of between 22 and 24, surrounded by several rows of bracts, the largest of which are 22–27 mm (0.9–1 in) long and about 3 mm (0.1 in) wide. The inflorescences are bell-shaped and hang down. The individual flowers have white petals and the style is red, curved and 10–16 mm (0.4–0.6 in) long.

== Taxonomy and naming ==
Darwinia whicherensis was first formally described in 2009 by Greg Keighery from a specimen collected from the base of the Whicher Range escarpment and the description was published in Nuytsia. The specific epithet (whicherensis) refers to the location where the type specimen was found.

== Distribution and habitat ==
Abba bell is only known from the type location at the base of the Whicher Range, covering a total area of 5 square kilometres (2 sq mi). It grows on shallow sandy clay in winter-wet flats in Dryandra squarrosa shrubland.

== Conservation ==
Darwinia whicherensis is classified as "Threatened Flora (Declared Rare Flora — Extant)" by the Western Australian Government Department of Parks and Wildlife under Western Australia's Wildlife Conservation Act 1950 and as "Endangered" (EN) under the Australian Government Environment Protection and Biodiversity Conservation Act 1999 (EPBC Act) as a result of having a single wild population comprising a very low number of mature individuals and the restricted area of occupancy of the species. The principal threats to the species are fire and disease caused by Phytophthora cinnamomi and Armillaria luteobubalina.
