= Wandoo =

Wandoo is the common name for a number of Western Australian Eucalyptus species, all of which have smooth white bark.

The original "wandoo" is Eucalyptus wandoo. Additional species have been given this name because of a perceived likeness with E. wandoo. These include

- Eucalyptus redunca (wandoo)
- Eucalyptus accedens (wandoo, or powder-bark wandoo)
- Eucalyptus capillosa (wheatbelt wandoo)
- Eucalyptus lane-poolei (salmonbark wandoo)
- Eucalyptus livida (mallee wandoo)
- Eucalyptus nigrifunda (desert wandoo)
