= Armillaria paulensis =

Scientific classification
- Domain: Eukaryota
- Kingdom: Fungi
- Division: Basidiomycota
- Class: Agaricomycetes
- Order: Agaricales
- Family: Physalacriaceae
- Genus: Armillaria
- Species: A. paulensis

Binomial name
- Armillaria paulensis Capelari

Species of fungus

Armillaria paulensis is a species of mushroom in the family Physalacriaceae. This species is found in South America.

== See also ==
- List of Armillaria species
