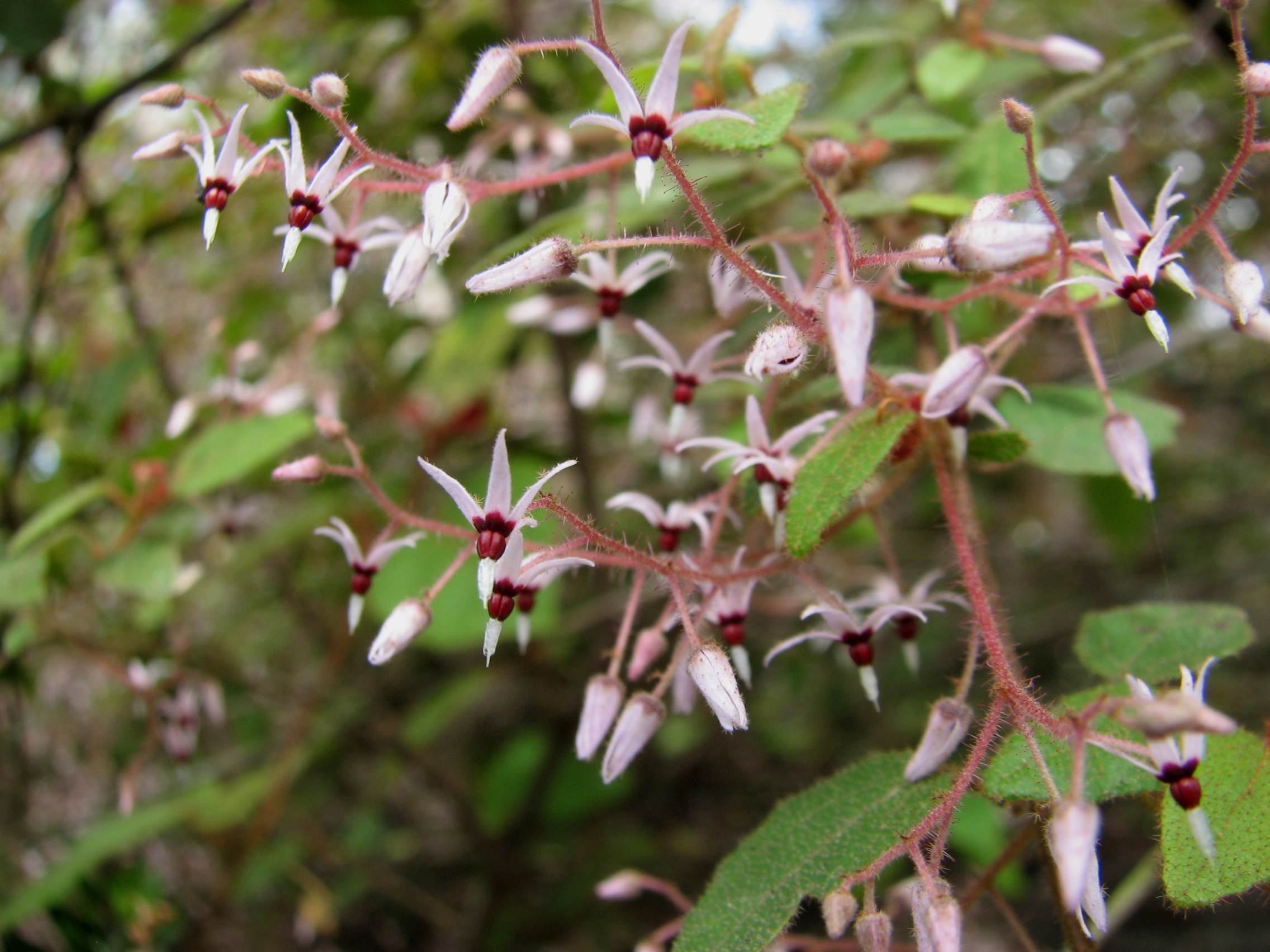
- In Maranoa Gardens

Scientific classification
- Kingdom: Plantae
- Clade: Tracheophytes
- Clade: Angiosperms
- Clade: Eudicots
- Clade: Rosids
- Order: Malvales
- Family: Malvaceae
- Genus: Lasiopetalum
- Species: L. floribundum

Binomial name
- Lasiopetalum floribundum Benth.

Synonyms
- Corethrostylis oppositifolia F.Muell.; Corethrostylis parviflora Turcz.

= Lasiopetalum floribundum =

Species of shrub

Lasiopetalum floribundum, commonly known as free flowering lasiopetalum, is a species of flowering plant in the family Malvaceae and is endemic to the south-west of Western Australia. It is an erect or spreading shrub with hairy young stems, egg-shaped leaves and pale pink, mauve or white flowers.

== Description ==
Lasiopetalum floribundum is an erect or spreading shrub that typically grows to a height of 0.3–3 m (1 ft 0 in – 9 ft 10 in), its young stems densely covered with pale brown, golden or rust-coloured, star-shaped hairs. The leaves are egg-shaped, mostly 25–58 mm (0.98–2.28 in) long and 13–43 mm (0.51–1.69 in) wide on a petiole 2.5–15 mm (0.098–0.591 in) long, the lower surface densely covered with star-shaped hairs. The flowers are borne in groups of ten to twenty-three, 43–73 mm (1.7–2.9 in) long on a peduncle 20–38 mm (0.79–1.50 in) long, each flower on a pedicel 2.6–3.8 mm (0.10–0.15 in) long with linear bracts 0.9–1.6 mm (0.035–0.063 in) long at the base and bracteoles 0.5–1.2 mm (0.020–0.047 in) long near the base of the sepals. The sepals are pale pink, mauve or white with narrowly egg-shaped lobes 5.1–5.5 mm (0.20–0.22 in) long and there are no petals. Flowering occurs from September to December.

== Taxonomy ==
Lasiopetalum floribundum was first formally described in 1863 by George Bentham in Flora Australiensis. In 2017, Kelly Anne Shepherd and Carolyn F. Wilkins designated the specimens collected by James Drummond in the Swan River Colony as the lectotype. The specific epithet (floribundum) means "flowering profusely".

== Distribution and habitat ==
This lasiopetalum grows in forest, usually in river valleys and near creeks from near the Canning Dam to West Cape Howe National Park in the Avon Wheatbelt, Jarrah Forest, Swan Coastal Plain and Warren biogeographic regions of south-western Western Australia.

== Conservation status ==
Lasiopetalum floribundum is listed as "not threatened" by the Government of Western Australia Department of Biodiversity, Conservation and Attractions.
