= Armillaria montagnei =

Scientific classification
- Domain: Eukaryota
- Kingdom: Fungi
- Division: Basidiomycota
- Class: Agaricomycetes
- Order: Agaricales
- Family: Physalacriaceae
- Genus: Armillaria
- Species: A. montagnei

Binomial name
- Armillaria montagnei (Singer) Herink (1973)

Synonyms
- Armillariella montagnei Singer (1956)

Species of fungus

Armillaria montagnei is a species of agaric fungus in the family Physalacriaceae. This species is found in Australia, Europe, New Zealand, and South America.

== See also ==
- List of Armillaria species
