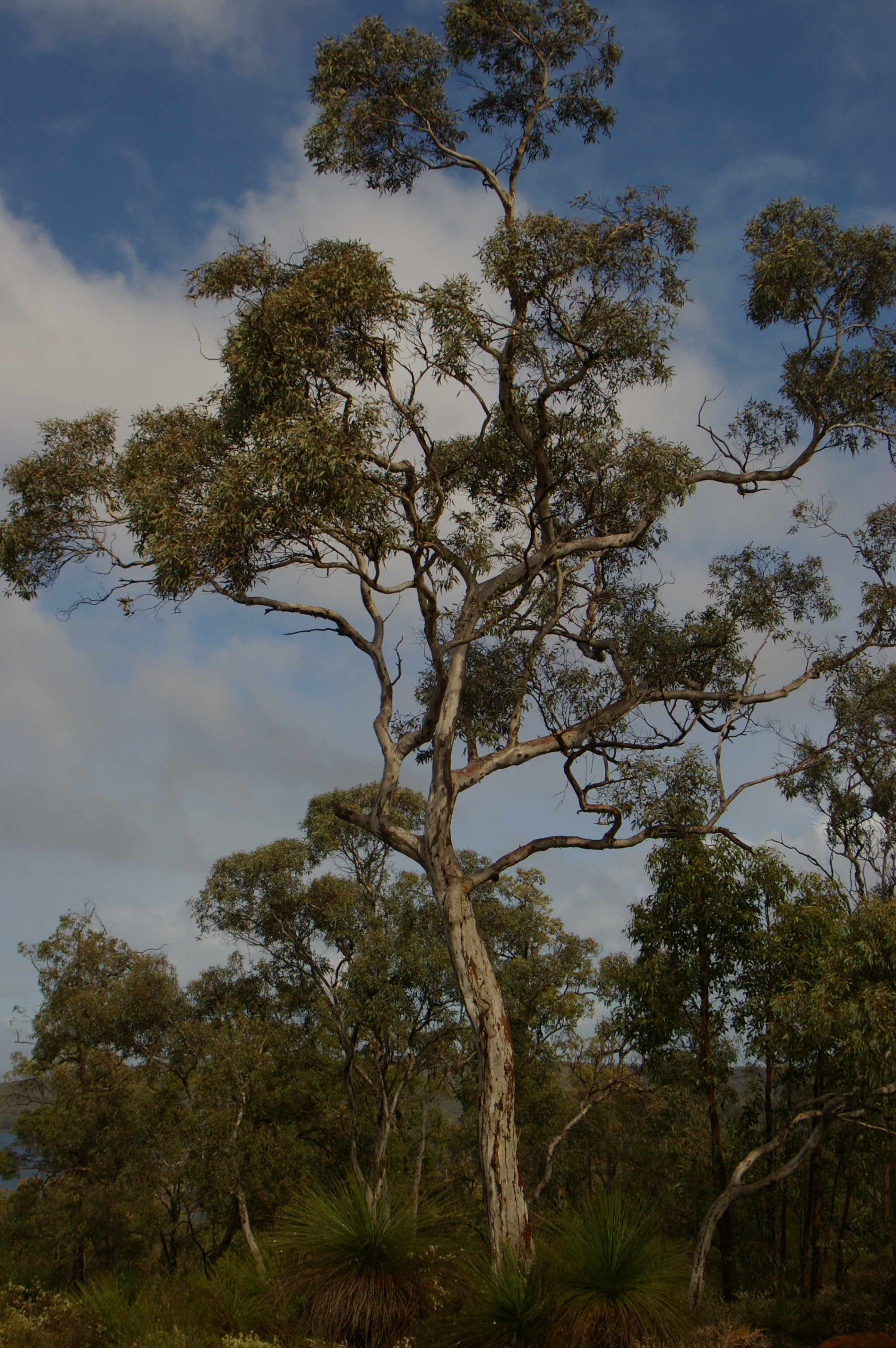

Conservation status
- Vulnerable (IUCN 3.1)

Scientific classification
- Kingdom: Plantae
- Clade: Tracheophytes
- Clade: Angiosperms
- Clade: Eudicots
- Clade: Rosids
- Order: Myrtales
- Family: Myrtaceae
- Genus: Eucalyptus
- Species: E. wandoo

Binomial name
- Eucalyptus wandoo Blakely
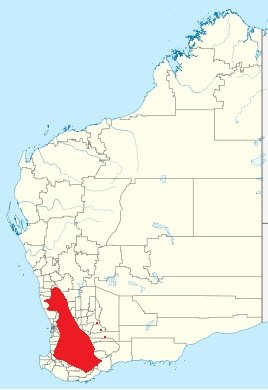
- Approximate native range of E. wandoo

Synonyms
- Eucalyptus redunca var. elata

= Eucalyptus wandoo =

Wandoo

Species of eucalyptus

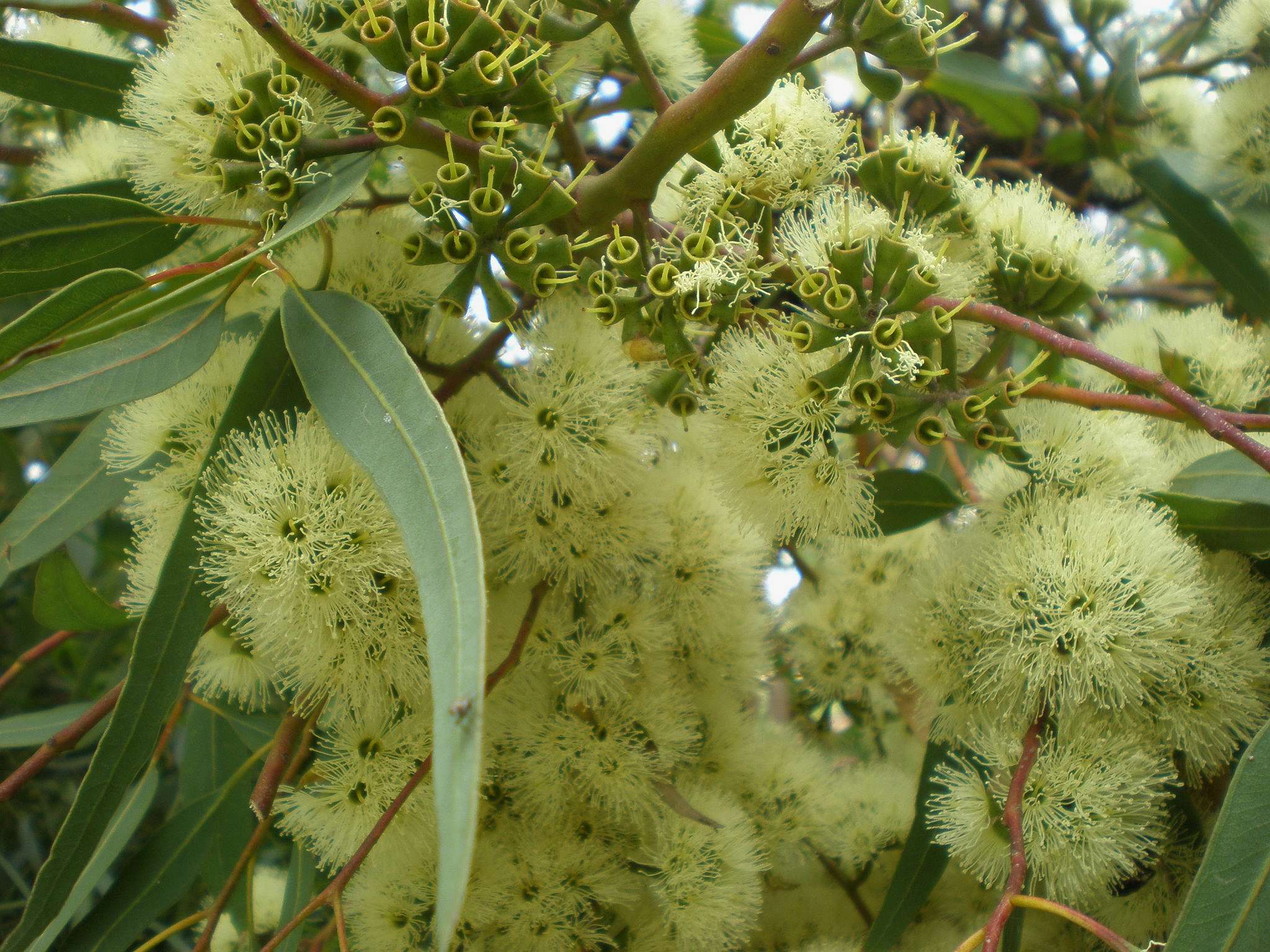
E. wandoo blossom and capsules

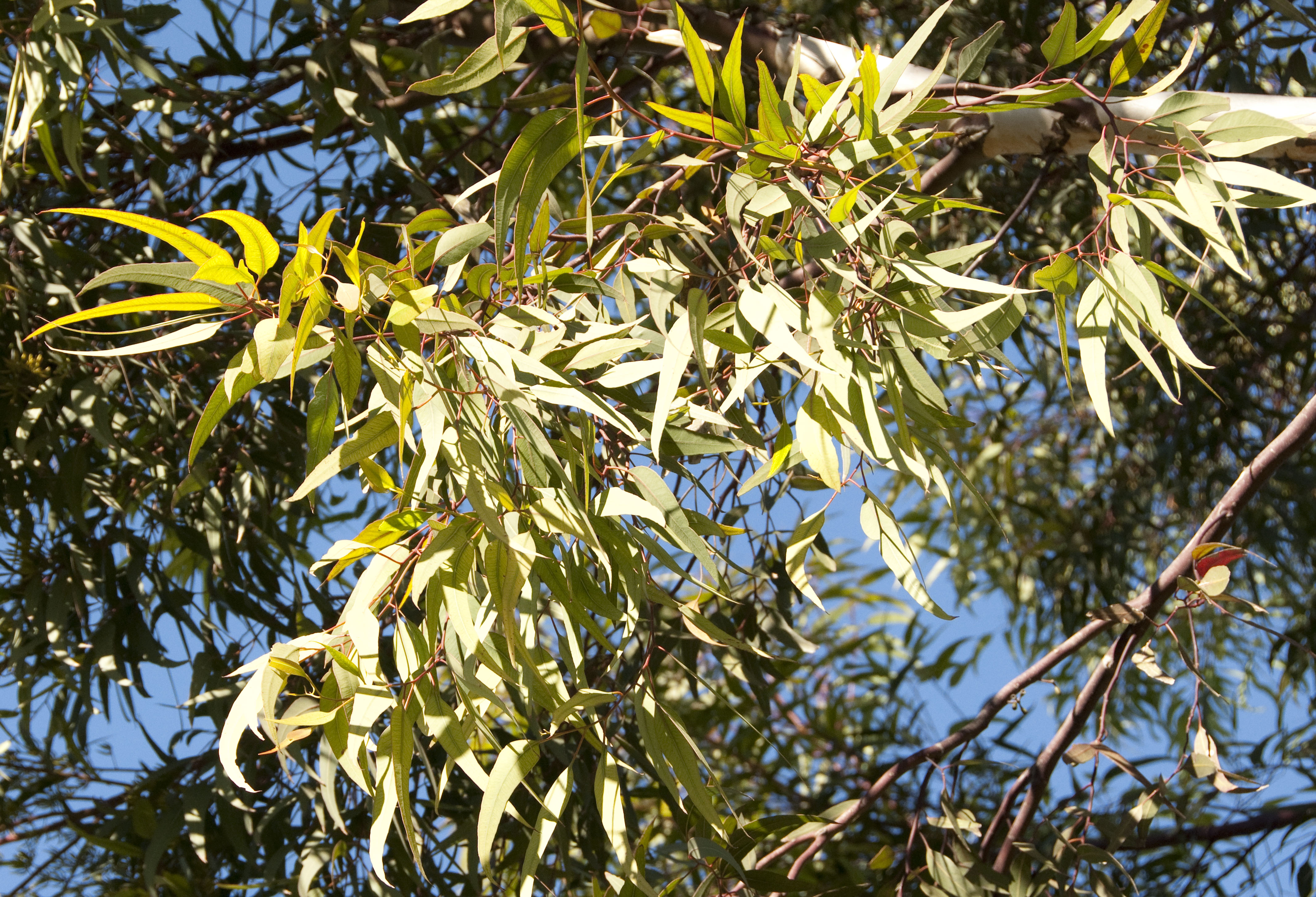
E. wandoo foliage

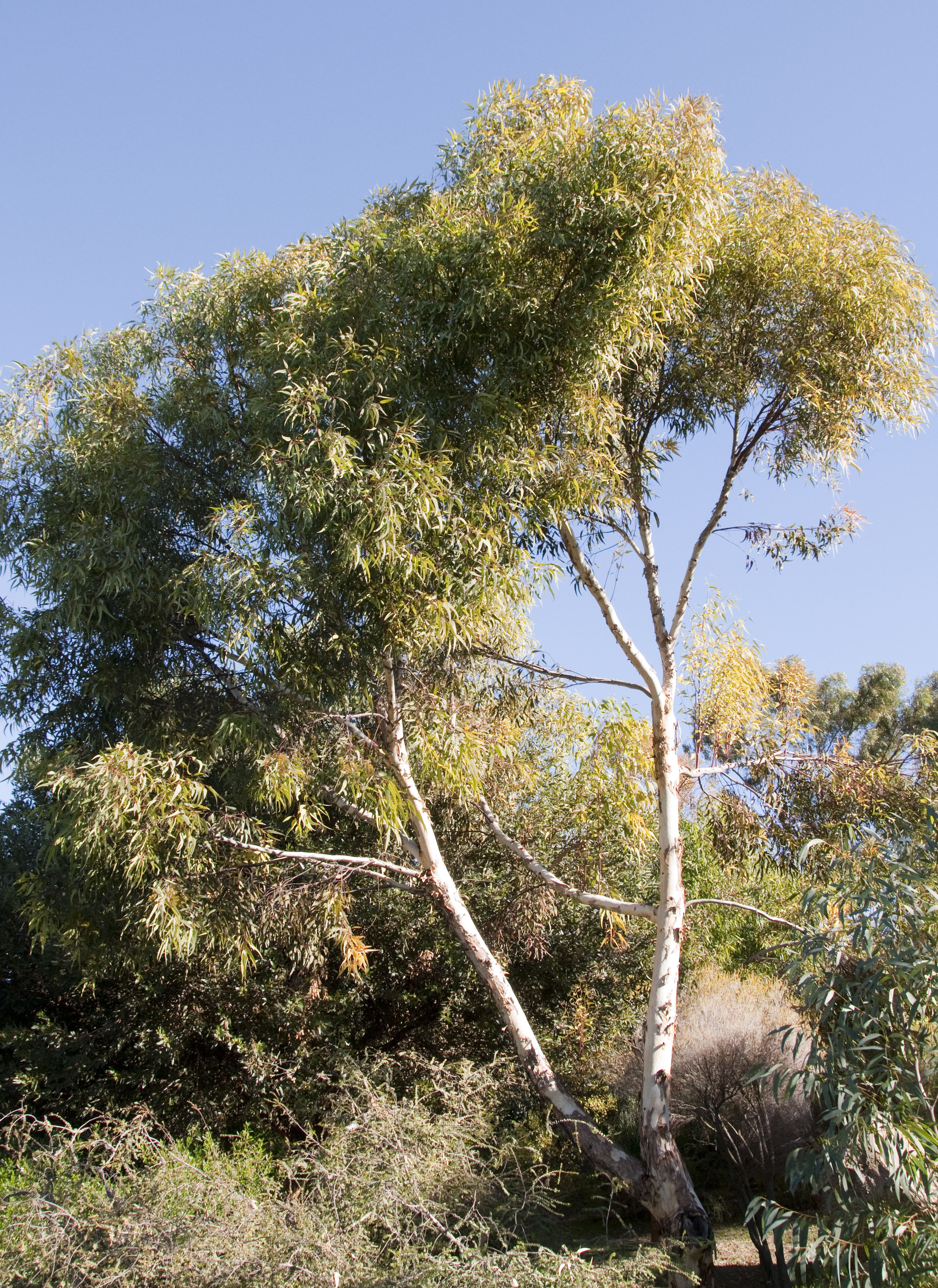
E. wandoo cultivated in Jardí Botànic de Barcelona

Eucalyptus wandoo, commonly known as wandoo, dooto, warrnt or wornt and sometimes as white gum, is a small to medium-sized tree that is endemic to the southwest of Western Australia. It has smooth bark, lance-shaped adult leaves, flower buds in groups of nine to seventeen, white flowers and conical to cylindrical fruit. It is one of a number of similar Eucalyptus species known as wandoo.

E. wandoo was first described in 1934 by the Australian botanist William Faris Blakely in his book A Key to the Eucalypts using material collected by the English collector Augustus Frederick Oldfield from a sand plain along the Kalgan River. As of January 2023, Plants of the World Online lists Eucalyptus redunca var. elata as a taxonomic synonym of E. wandoo.

The range of the tree extends from Morawa in the north extending south through the Darling Range down to around the Stirling Range to the south coast near the Pallinup River. There is an outlying population found to the east of Narembeen at Twine Reserve. It is native to the following IBRA bioregions: Geraldton Sandplains and Avon Wheatbelt in the north through the Swan Coastal Plain and Jarrah Forest to the Esperance Plains and Mallee in the south.

E. wandoo was listed as Vulnerable by the International Union for Conservation of Nature (IUCN) as of 2019 as a result of its severely fragmented population.

== Description ==
Eucalyptus wandoo is a tree that typically grows to a height of 3 to 25 m (9.8 to 82.0 ft) and sometimes to 30–31 m (98–102 ft), and has an 80 to 100 cm (31 to 39 in) DBH. The bole or trunk of the tree is usually straight and comprises 50–65% of the total height of the tree. E. wandoo can have a long lifetime, with some trees in excess of 150 years of age and others in excess of 400 years. As trees age the growth rate slows down making an accurate determination of age more difficult. It forms an inconspicuous lignotuber, the woody tuber that begins to develop near the base of seedlings, but can become huge in older trees and contains embedded epicormic buds that allow the plant to regenerate following destruction of the crown following fire or drought.

Saplings, young trees and coppice regrowth have rough and fibrous yellow-brown bark on the stems that become smoother as trees mature. The stems of saplings can be circular or square shaped in cross section and have a powdery coating (glaucous). Older trees have smooth powdery or non-powdery white bark, often with patches of white, grey or light brown giving the trunk a mottled appearance. Old layers of darker coloured bark are scattered and loosely held and are shed in flakes; it is not uncommon for a few flakes to persist on the trunk for a long time. The bark is shed in irregular slabs. Branchlets do not have a powdery coating as the bark of older trees can. The soft central cylinder of tissue within, the pith, contains many glands.

Young plants and coppice regrowth have blue-green leaves that are arranged oppositely (borne at the same level but on directly opposite sides of their common axis) for two to four nodes where the leaves arise then arranged alternately (found singly at different levels along the stem). The leaves can be egg-shaped, broadly lance-shaped or D-shaped. The leaves can have a length of 45–150 mm (1.8–5.9 in) and a width of 25–75 mm (0.98–2.95 in). Adult leaves are the same shade of greyish-green or greyish-blue on both sides but can sometimes be a glossy green. The adult leaves are lance-shaped or have a curved lance shape. Adult leaves are 75–125 mm (3.0–4.9 in) in length and 10–28 mm (0.39–1.10 in) wide on a petiole 10–20 mm (0.39–0.79 in) long. The side veins in the leaves are at an angle greater than 45° to the midrib and there is moderate to dense reticulation; the leaf oil glands are found at the intersections of the veinlets.

The inflorescences are arranged in leaf axils in groups of nine to seventeen on an unbranched peduncle 8–20 mm (0.31–0.79 in) long, the individual buds on pedicels 3–5 mm (0.12–0.20 in) long. Mature buds are spindle-shaped but curved and with a scar present, the buds are 8–14 mm (0.31–0.55 in) in length and 2–4 mm (0.079–0.157 in) wide with a conical operculum up to twice as long as the floral cup. There are some erect outer stamens; the majority of stamen are bent sharply downward to some degree. The oblong anthers are attached dorsally to the filament and burst open spontaneously via longitudinal slits. It has a straight and long style and a blunt to rounded stigma leading to the ovary that has three to four cavities containing four vertically arranged rows of ovules. Flowering occurs between March and June for wandoo found to the north of the Avon Valley; these are known as the winter wandoo. The spring wandoo found to the south of Wandering flowers in spring and early summer or from September to January, while the summer wandoo, also found to the south of Wandering, flowers from January to February. The flowers are white or cream-coloured. The pollen and nectar are a valuable source of protein, vitamins, fats and minerals for honey bees. Analysis of amino acids in the pollen yield results of 1.69–1.91% aspartic acid, 2.23–2.54% glutamic acid, 2.52–2.67% proline and 1.63–1.69% arginine. The total amount of protein in the pollen was 21.8–23.7%.

The fruit is a woody capsule 6–10 mm (0.24–0.39 in) long and 5–6 mm (0.20–0.24 in) wide with the valves near rim level. The woody fruits that form after flowering have cylindrical to oblong-obconical shape and are on stalks that are 0.1 to 0.4 cm (0.039 to 0.157 in) in length. The fruits are 0.6 to 1 cm (0.24 to 0.39 in) in length and have a width of 0.5 to 0.6 cm (0.20 to 0.24 in) with a descending disc and three to four valves that are at the rim level or enclosed. The seeds inside have a sub-spherical to cuboid shape with a smooth straw to mid-brown coloured surface. The seeds are 0.7 to 1.3 mm (0.028 to 0.051 in) in length with marks (hilum) on the seed coat where it was once attached to the ovary wall.

The species has a haploid chromosome number of 12.

== Taxonomy ==
Eucalyptus wandoo was first described in 1934 by the Australian botanist William Faris Blakely in his book A Key to the Eucalypts. The specific epithet "wandoo" comes from the Noongar name for the tree. The type specimen was collected by the English collector Augustus Frederick Oldfield from a sand plain along the Kalgan River. The holotype is held at Kew Gardens.

In 1991, Ian Brooker and Stephen Hopper described two subspecies and the names have been accepted by the Australian Plant Census and Plants of the World Online:

- Eucalyptus wandoo subsp. pulverea has powdery bark, glaucous branchlets and larger juvenile leaves than the autonym.
- Eucalyptus wandoo subsp. wandoo has bark that is not powdery, yellow new bark, branchlets that are not glaucous and narrower juvenile leaves than those of subspecies pulverea.

Plants of the World Online, but not the Australian Plant Census, lists Eucalyptus redunca var. elata, formally described in 1867 by George Bentham in Flora Australiensis, as a synonym of E. wandoo.

E. wandoo is a part of the Symphyomyrtus subgenus and belongs to section Bisectae and the Glandulosae subsection, which all have bisected cotyledons, an operculum scar and where oil glands are found in the pith of the branchlets. Within the Glandulosae subsection wandoo forms a group of 14 species that are a part of series Levispermae and subseries Cubiformes. All of this subseries have a smooth cuboid shaped seed and narrow spindle-like shaped buds that have some stamens that are erect and others that are deflexed.

The tree is most closely related to Eucalyptus capillosa (inland wandoo) and Eucalyptus nigrifunda. The bark of E. capillosa is usually more colourful than that of E. wandoo and E. nigrifunda often retains more rough basal bark than E. wandoo. Wandoo is also closely related to Eucalyptus salmonophloia (salmon gum). Although Eucalyptus accedens is known as powderbark wandoo it belongs to a taxonomic series.

E. accedens is easily confused with E. wandoo, and the two are often found growing in the same soil types. Wandoo is usually a larger tree and E. accedens often has an orange tinge to the bark. When rubbed with the hand the bark of E. accedens rubs off as a white powder.

== Distribution and habitat ==
Wandoo occurs in the south west of Western Australia from Morawa in the north extending south through the Darling Range down to around the Stirling Range to the south coast near the Pallinup River. There is an outlying population found to the east of Narembeen at Twine Reserve. It grows in sandy loams, clay loams or dark brown loamy soils and stony soils, that can contain laterite, granite or gravel as part of an undulating landscape. It is found along the base of the Darling Scarp and spreads south and east out into the Wheatbelt and as far as the Great Southern. It is native to the following IBRA bioregions; Geraldton Sandplains and Avon Wheatbelt in the north through the Swan Coastal Plain and Jarrah Forest to the Esperance Plains and Mallee in the south. Wandoo is absent from the high rainfall areas between these regions. Subspecies pulverea is less common and occurs between Cataby and Morawa. It is usually found at elevations of 100 to 300 m (330 to 980 ft) in valleys or on plateaux and ridges where there is a Mediterranean climate and most rainfall occurs in the winter months and there is an average rainfall of 500 to 1,000 mm (20 to 39 in) per annum although it can be dry for six to seven months of the year. The average temperature range is usually 2 to 35 °C (36 to 95 °F). It is often part of jarrah forest in medium rainfall areas but is not usually found in high rainfall areas. The tree forms an open woodland where it often forms the overstorey mixed in with jarrah and marri trees. Agricultural clearing has significantly altered the distribution of the tree and it now has a fragmented distribution and is mostly situated in conservation reserves, state forests, on roadside verges and as paddock trees.

It is able to grow in slightly saline soils and can tolerate salinity levels of 50–100 mS/m. It is regarded as a moderately salt tolerant species when compared to other species of Eucalyptus that are endemic to Western Australia.

E. wandoo has been introduced into parts of Africa. It is cultivated in southern Africa as well as in Tunisia and Algeria.

The tree is also grown in the United States in the states of Arizona and California.

== Conservation status ==
Both subspecies of E. wandoo are classified as "not threatened" by the Government of Western Australia's Department of Parks and Wildlife. Decline of the habitat and crown decline of wandoo has been studied. It is estimated that there has been a decline in the crown size of Wandoo trees since the 1980s which is due to a decline in the health of the population. Some of the causes are thought to be changed fire regimes, climate variability, land clearing, fungal and insect activity and salinity. E. wandoo is endemic to south western parts of Western Australia where it was once widespread. Only about 5% of the tree's habitat now remains with the rest having been cleared for agriculture.

E. wandoo was listed as Vulnerable by the International Union for Conservation of Nature (IUCN) as of 2019. The population was described as stable but severely fragmented and it is currently spread across an area of over 14,000 km^{2} (5,400 sq mi) compared to a pre-clearing area of over 92,000 km^{2} (36,000 sq mi).

== Ecology ==
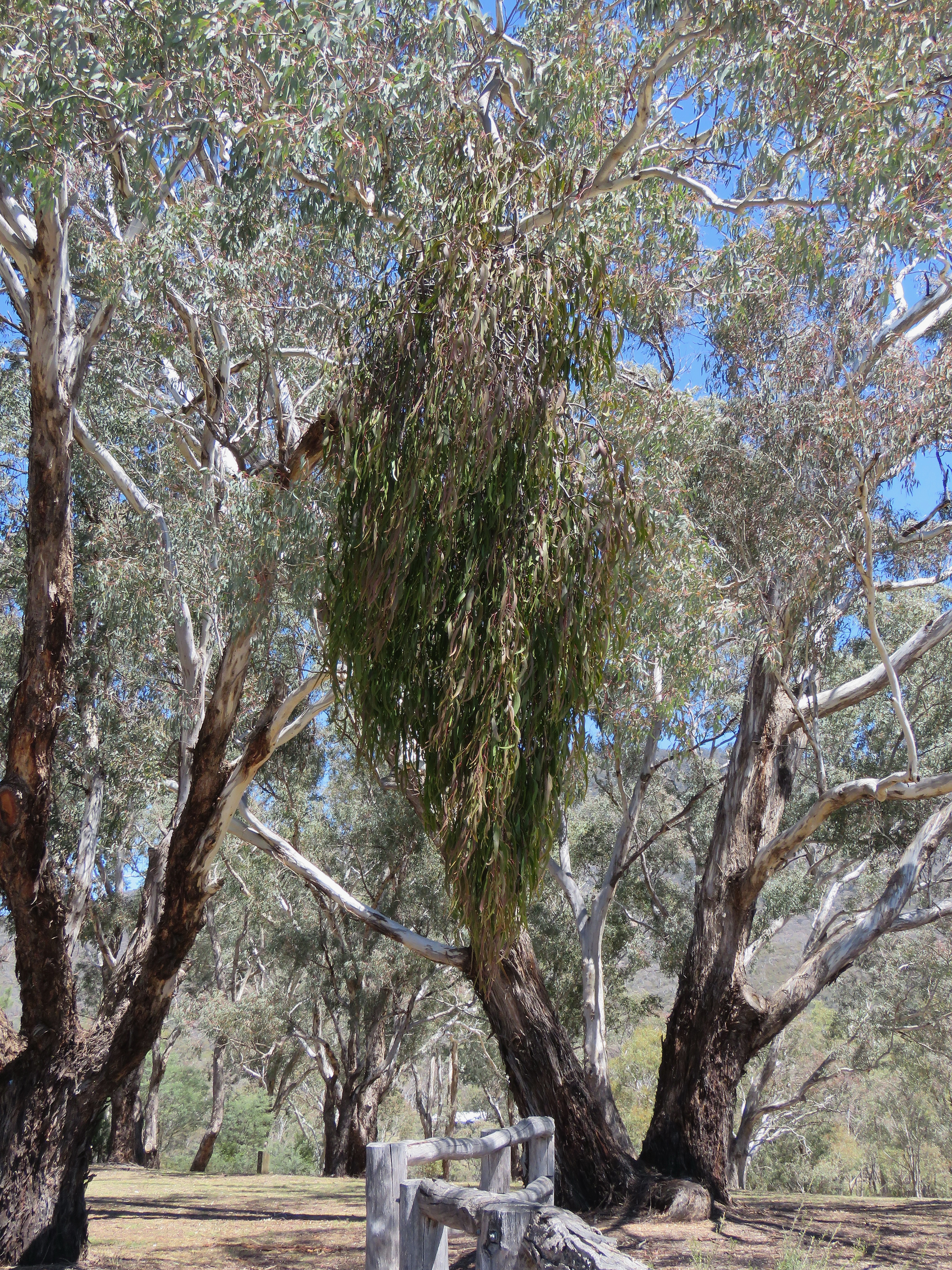
Amyema miquelii, a species of mistletoe, growing on a Eucalyptus tree

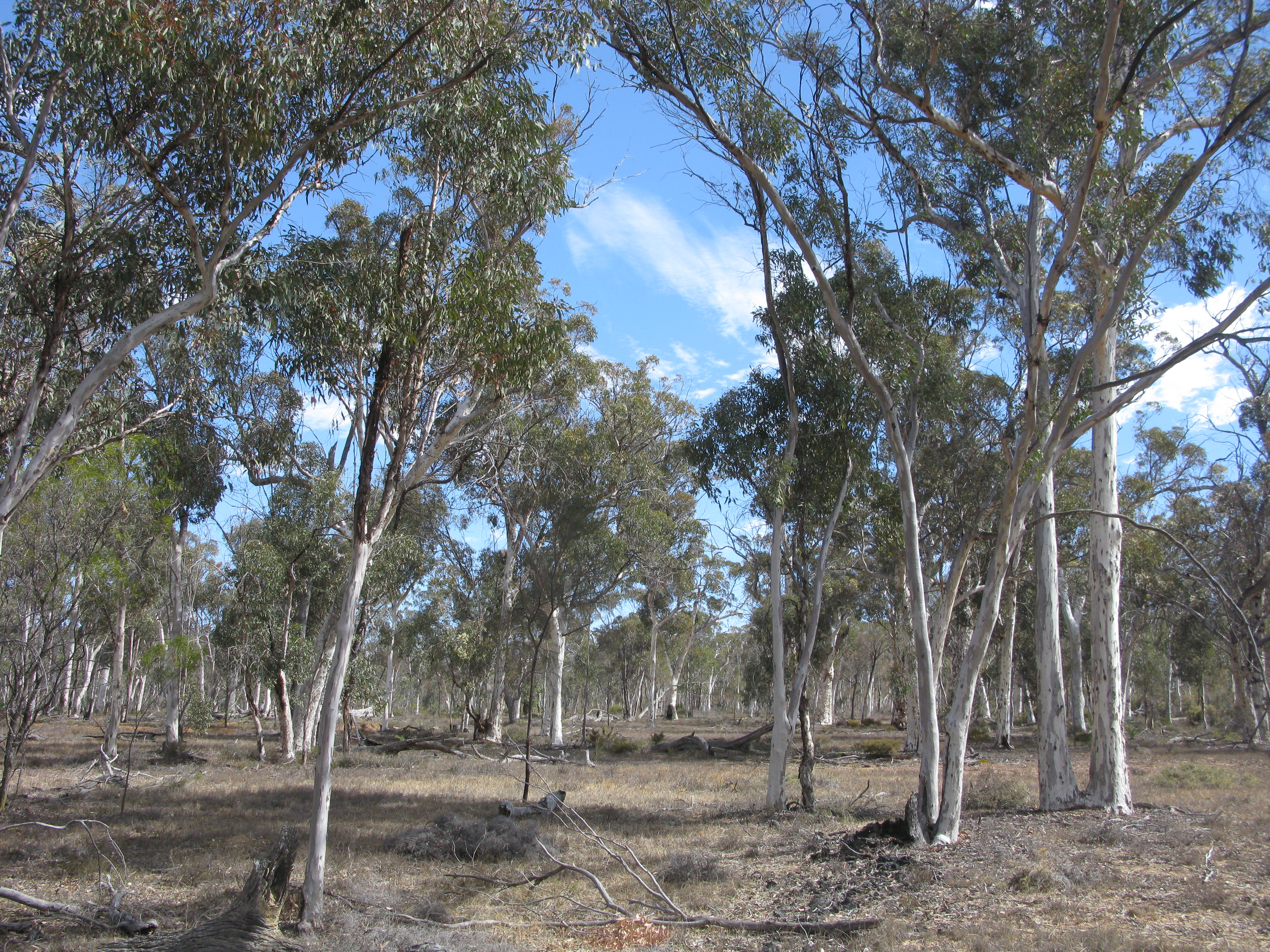
E. wandoo woodland

The woodlands formed by wandoo are composed of open stands of widely spaced trees over sparse understoreys of shrubs, grasses and herbs. The range of plants which flower through the year provide a constant source of nectar for birds, including honeyeaters, as well as insects. The insects then provide a source of food for other birds including the golden whistler, western yellow robin and rufous treecreeper. Wandoo is vital for native wildlife with various animal species using tree hollows and shed branches as habitat. The flowers are a good source of nectar for birds and insects. The bark and foliage of the tree is home to an abundance of spiders and insects, including native cockroaches, thrips, beetles and flies. These organisms are important for pollination, seed dispersal and recycling nutrients as well as attracting insectivorous birds. E. wandoo acts as a host plant for the parasitic species of mistletoe Amyema miquelii. Hollows in live or dead trees with a diameter at breast height of over 300 mm (12 in) are known nesting areas for black cockatoos, including Carnaby's black cockatoo. The birds use these sites, when situated in woodlands or forests, as a breeding habitat. Carnaby's black cockatoos are also known to use the flowers and seeds as a food source and the trees as a roosting site. Hollow logs of these trees found on the ground are used as habitat by echidnas through the Wheatbelt region.

=== Destructors ===
E. wandoo is affected by the beetle Cisseis fascigera, causing a condition known as crown decline. The beetle lays its eggs during the summer months in the twig bark. Once the eggs hatch then the larvae bore straight down into the twigs and consume the bark and cambium tissue underneath into the twigs and branches causing damaging branch tissue. Consequently flagging (where groups of terminal foliage die off) and death of branches occurs, usually in autumn. Trees are also affected by psyllid bugs or lerp that can attack the foliage causing discolouration then the loss of leaves.

=== Reproduction ===
Large masses of white or cream-coloured flowers are produced by the tree between December and May, but individual trees usually flower at different times and the male stamens mature before the female stigmas. Flowering occurs between March and June for wandoo found to the north of the Avon Valley; these are known as the winter wandoo. The spring wandoo found to the south of Wandering flower in spring and early summer or from September to January while the summer wandoo, also found to the south of Wandering, flower from January to February. Pollination by animals is required by the flowers to set the woody fruit capsules. The seeds commonly have a limited dispersal throughout the ecosystem. E. wandoo trees found in saline areas and amongst smaller populations are inclined to produce a smaller number of fruits and seeds.

=== Pollinators ===
Wandoo is pollinated by both birds and insects and has a mixed mating system. Trees that are part of smaller populations are found to have noticeably higher pollination levels than trees that are part of larger populations. Up to 65% of pollen that is transferred to plants in fragmented populations is sourced from other populations that are located over 1 km (0.62 mi) apart.

=== Disease ===
The tree is susceptible to root rot caused by the Armillaria luteobubalina fungus and is known to have a high mortality rate. Wandoo is among several eucalypts that are resistant to the Phytophthora cinnamomi fungi commonly known as dieback.

== Uses ==
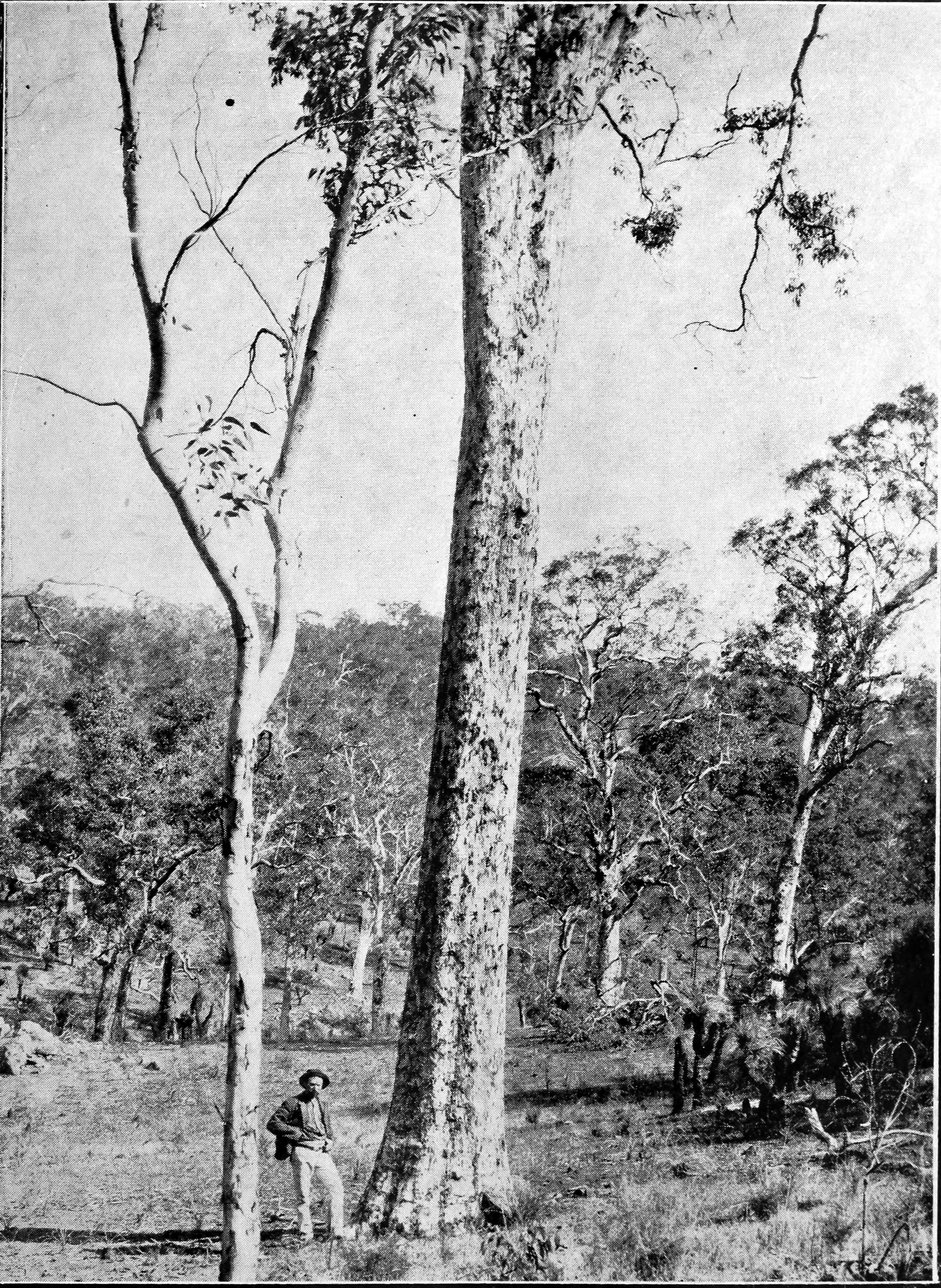
Wandoo in A primer of forestry, with illustrations of the principal forest trees of Western Australia 1922

The indigenous Noongar peoples used wandoo as a medicinal plant with antibacterial properties and the leaves are steamed or used to make poultices to relieve congestion. The dried gum of the plant was ground up and utilised as an ointment.

The wandoo also has outer parts of the roots that are juicy and sweet and were scratched off and consumed. When the flowers are soaked for a while in water it will produce a sweet drink. The wood of this species is extremely dense, with a air-dry density of 1,100 kg/m^{3} (1,900 lb/cu yd) and a green density of 1,100 kg/m^{3} (1,900 lb/cu yd), and is used for a range of heavy-duty construction purposes, including as railway sleepers, poles, wood flooring joists, beams, girders and by wheelwrights. Wandoo was renowned as being the most suitable timber for the production of railway sleepers. There was once an industry in the extraction of tannin from the bark and wood. These days the wood is not much available, as the wandoo forests are preserved for recreation and watershed protection. The wood and bark contains 10–12% tannin. In the 1960s over 68,000 long tons (69,000 t) of wandoo was used to produce tannins for the petroleum, leather and fishing industries. The wood has a yellow to light reddish brown colour, is textured with a wavy to interlocked grain, and is considered extremely durable and resistant to termites. The wood also has no chemical reactions with metal fastenings. In the 1960s 2.7×10^{6} cu ft (76×10^{3} m^{3}) mill logs of the wood was harvested. Demand for the wood was such that sawmills in Narrogin and Boyup Brook were entirely dependent upon the supply of wandoo.

When dried, E. wandoo is among Australia's hardest timber when measured by the Janka hardness test. At 15,000 kN, E. wandoo is twice as hard as jarrah, and of comparable hardness to grey ironbark, making it Australia's second or third hardest timber. E. wandoo has a density rating of 1280 kg/m3, making it Australia's densest species of true Eucalyptus. As per the CSIRO 1996 Timber Durability Class Ratings, which assesses the natural resistance or durability of the heartwood of various species of Australian timber species, E. wandoo has a rating of "1 for decay", and "1 for decay + termites", classifying it as a timber of the highest natural durability.

Wandoo is also famous for the honey produced by bees from the tree's pollen and nectar and is a mainstay for Western Australia's apiculture industry.

Essential oils can also be extracted from the leaves. The composition and quantity of oil varies from plant to plant but the leaves can contain up to 1.8% essential oil including chemicals such as cymene, pinene, terpinene and 1,8-cineole (which are used in the pharmaceutical and cosmetic industries). In a 2021 study, leaves of E. wandoo grown in Tunisia were found to contain 2.0% essential oil with 37.7% of the oil being composed on 1,8 cineole, 35.8% of cymene, 6.5% of β-Pinene and 3.9% of γ-Terpinene. The oil was found to have antibacterial properties against six bacterial strains.

== See also ==
- List of Eucalyptus species
