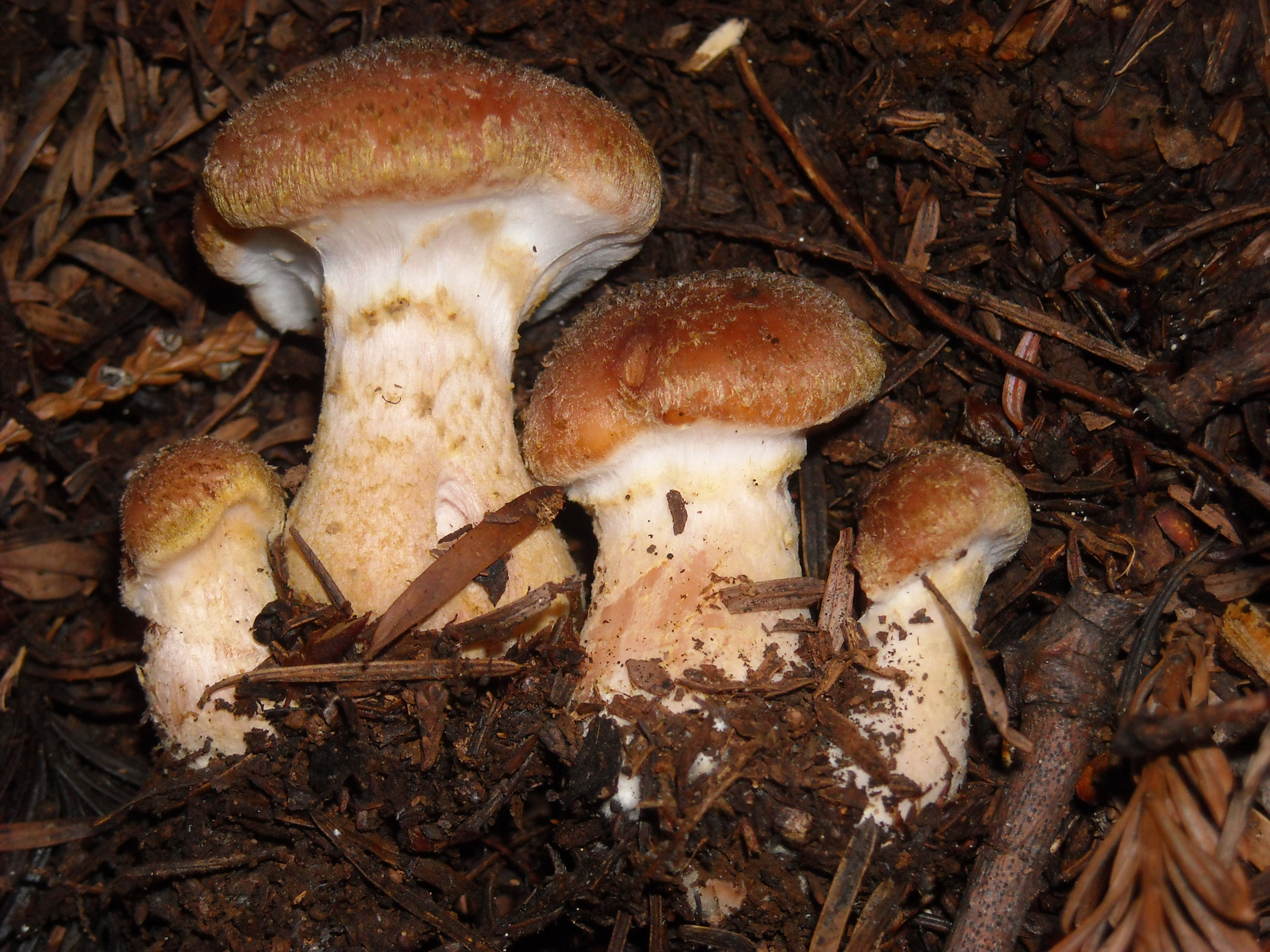

Scientific classification
- Kingdom: Fungi
- Division: Basidiomycota
- Class: Agaricomycetes
- Order: Agaricales
- Family: Physalacriaceae
- Genus: Armillaria
- Species: A. sinapina

Binomial name
- Armillaria sinapina Bérubé & Dessur. (1988)

= Armillaria sinapina =

Species of fungus

Armillaria sinapina is a species of mushroom in the family Physalacriaceae.

== Description ==
The brownish cap is 2–8 centimetres (3/4–3 1/4 in) wide and the white, fibrous stem is up to 10 cm (4 in) long. Both the flesh and spore print are whitish. The mycelium is bioluminescent.

=== Similar species ===
Armillaria gallica and A. calvescens grow only on dead wood (usually hardwood) but may require microscopy to distinguish. A. gemina and A. ostoyae are also similar.

== Habitat ==
A plant pathogenic fungus, it causes Armillaria root disease, and has been found on a variety of tree hosts in Alaska.

== See also ==
- List of Armillaria species
- List of bioluminescent fungi
