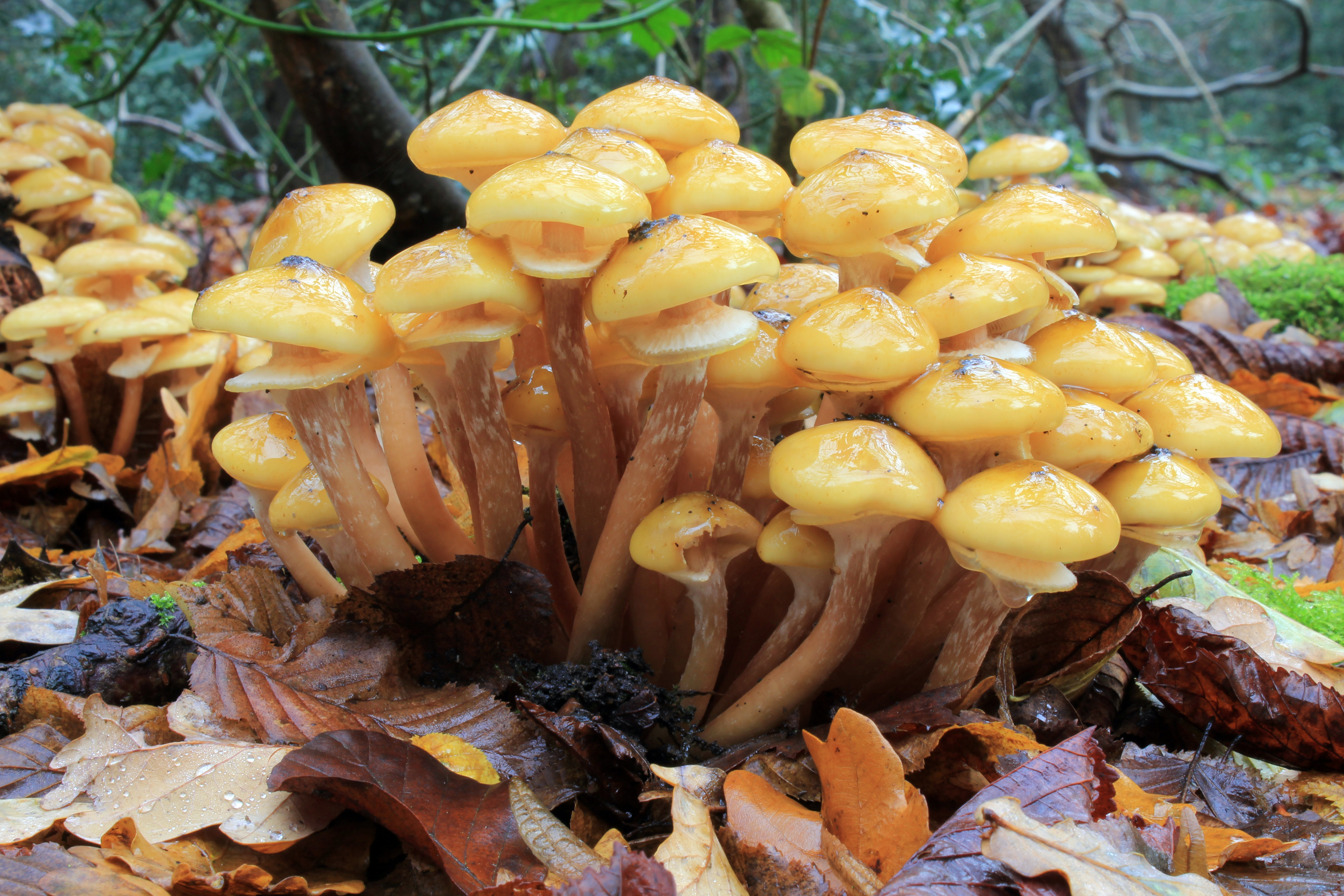

Scientific classification
- Kingdom: Fungi
- Division: Basidiomycota
- Class: Agaricomycetes
- Order: Agaricales
- Family: Physalacriaceae
- Genus: Armillaria
- Species: A. mellea

Binomial name
- Armillaria mellea (Vahl) P.Kumm. (1871)

Synonyms
- Agaricus melleus Vahl (1790); Agaricus sulphureus Weinm.; Armillaria mellea var. glabra Gillet (1874); Armillaria mellea var. maxima Barla (1887); Armillaria mellea var. minor Barla (1887); Armillaria mellea var. sulphurea (Weinm.) Fr. (1879); Armillariella mellea (Vahl) P.Karst. (1881); Clitocybe mellea (Vahl) Ricken (1915); Lepiota mellea (Vahl) J.E.Lange (1915)

= Armillaria mellea =

Species of fungus

Armillaria mellea
- Mycological characteristics
- Gills on hymenium
- Cap is convex or flat
- Hymenium is adnate or subdecurrent
- Stipe has a ring
- Spore print is white
- Ecology is parasitic
- Edibility is edible or can cause allergic reactions

Armillaria mellea is an edible basidiomycete fungus in the honey fungus genus Armillaria. It is a plant pathogen and part of a cryptic species complex of closely related and morphologically similar species. It causes Armillaria root rot in many plant species and produces mushrooms around the base of trees it has infected. The symptoms of infection appear in the crowns of infected trees as discoloured foliage, reduced growth, dieback of the branches and death. The mycelium is capable of producing light via bioluminescence.

The mushroom is widely distributed in temperate regions of the Northern Hemisphere, usually in heavy soils with temperatures under 79 °F (26 °C). It typically grows on hardwoods but may be found around and on living and dead wood or in open areas.

== Taxonomy ==
The species was originally named Agaricus melleus by Danish-Norwegian botanist Martin Vahl in 1790; it was transferred to the genus Armillaria in 1871 by Paul Kummer. Numerous subtaxa have been described:

Still-current subtaxa under A. mellea per MycoBank
Name	Authority	Year
var. camerunensis	Henn.	1895
var. flava	Peck	1897
var. glabra	Gillet	1874
var. javanica	Henn.	1900
var. maxima	Barla	1887
var. radicata	Peck	1891
var. viridiflava	Barla	1887
subsp. nipponica	J.Y.Cha & Igarashi	1995
f. rosea	Calonge & M.Seq.	2003
f. sabulicola	A. Ortega & G. Moreno	2010

MycoBank also lists f. mellea, subsp. mellea, and var. mellea as current with a "(?)".

=== Reclassified species ===
Armillaria mellea once included a range of species with similar features that have since been reclassified. The following are reassigned subtaxa, mostly variety-level entries from the 19th century:

Reassigned subtaxa of A. mellea
Name	Authority	Year	Current name
var. minor	Barla	1887	A. mellea (variety simply discarded)
var. bulbosa	Barla	1887	A. lutea
var. exannulata	Peck	1893	Desarmillaria tabescens
var. laricina	(Bolton) Barla	1887	A. laricina
var. obscura	Gillet	1874	A. ostoyae
var. sulphurea	(Weinm.) Fr.	1879	Agaricus sulphureus Weinm. (?)
var. tabescens	(Scop.) Rea & Ramsb.	1917	Desarmillaria tabescens
var. versicolor	(With.) W.G.Sm.	1908	A. versicolor Withering 1801

=== Common names ===
It is commonly known as honey fungus, stump mushroom, stumpie, honey mushroom, pipinky or pinky.

== Description ==
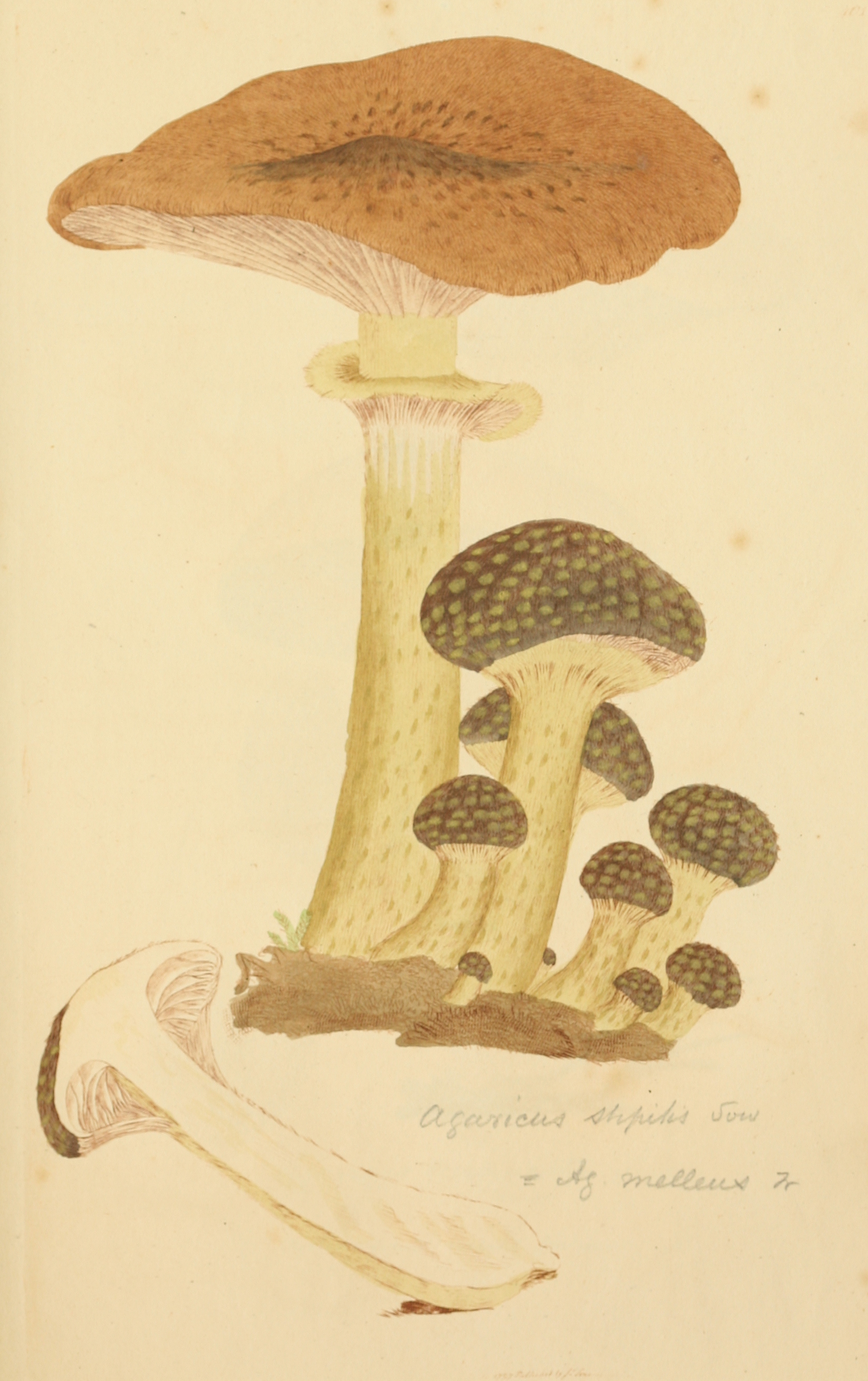
Illustration from James Sowerby's Coloured Figures of English Fungi or Mushrooms

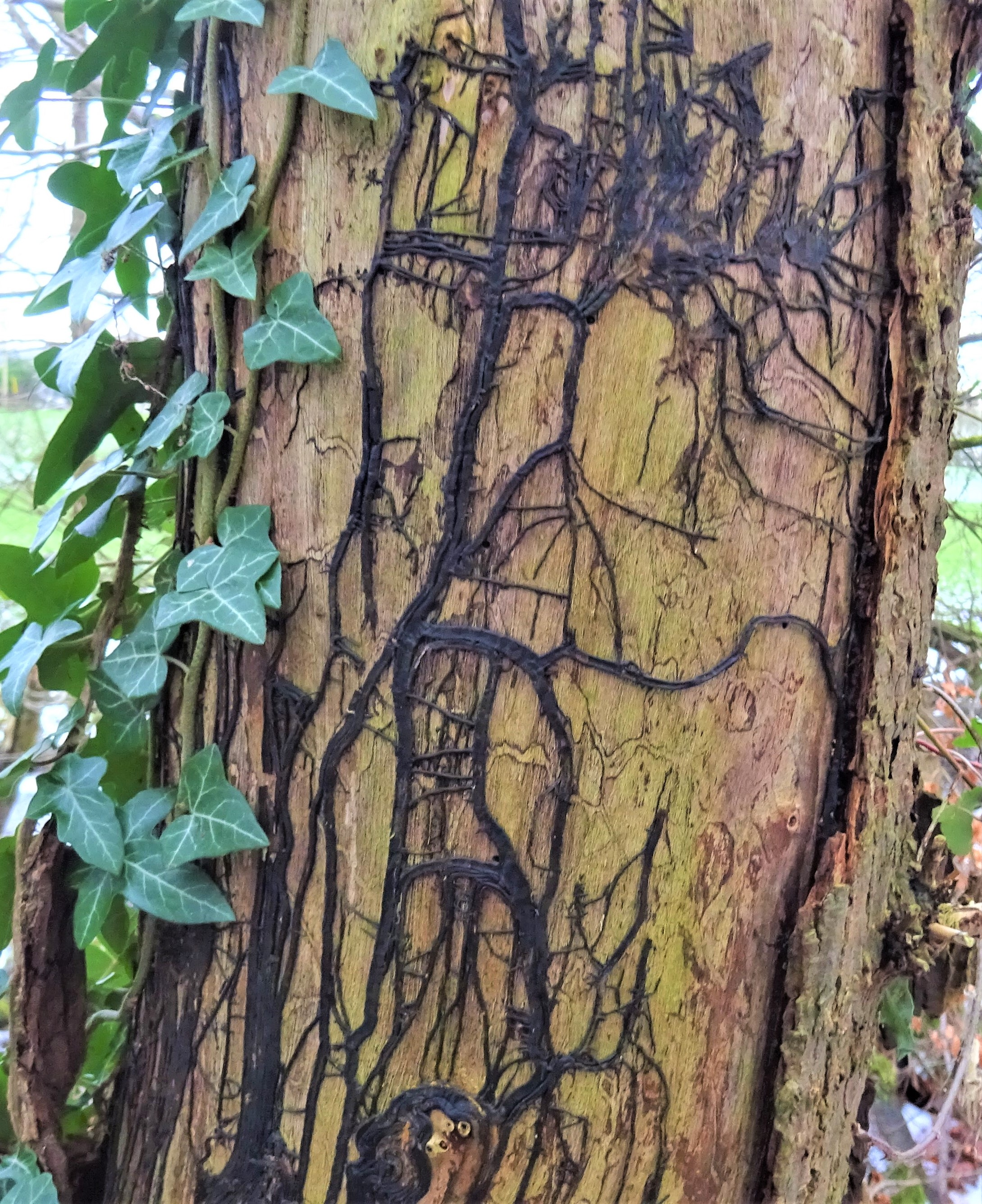
Honey fungus rhizomorphs

The basidiocarp of each has a smooth cap 3 to 15 cm (1 to 6 in) in diameter, convex at first but becoming flattened with age often with a central raised umbo, later becoming somewhat dish-shaped. The margins of the cap are often arched at maturity and the surface is sticky when wet. Though typically honey-coloured, this fungus is rather variable in appearance and sometimes has a few dark, hairy scales near the centre somewhat radially arranged. The gills are white at first, sometimes becoming pinkish-yellow or discoloured with age, broad and fairly distant, attached to the stipe at right angles or are slightly decurrent. The flesh of the cap is whitish and has a sweetish odour and flavour with a tinge of bitterness.

The stipe is 5–20 cm (2–8 in) long and 0.5–3.5 cm (1/4–1 1/2 in) in diameter. It is fibrillose and of a firm spongy consistency at first but later becomes hollow. It is cylindrical and tapers to a point at its base where it is fused to the stipes of other mushrooms in the clump. It is whitish at the upper end and brownish-yellow below, often with a very dark-coloured base. There is a broad persistent skin-like ring attached to the upper part of the stipe. This has a velvety margin and yellowish fluff underneath and extends outwards as a white partial veil protecting the gills when young.

Under the microscope, the spores are approximately elliptical, 6–9 by 5–7 μm, inamyloid with prominent apiculi (short, pointed projections) at the base. The spore print is white. The basidia (spore-producing structures) lack basal clamps.

The main part of the fungus is underground where a mat of mycelial threads may extend for great distances. They are bundled together in rhizomorphs that are black in this species. The fungal body is not bioluminescent but its mycelia are luminous when in active growth. This phenomenon results from a blockage that inhibits the synthesis of hispidin, the precursor to luciferin, as well as 3-hydroxyhispidin hydroxylase in the mushrooms.

=== Similar species ===
In addition to a number of reclassified species, Armillaria gemina lacks the yellow cap background and A. nabsnona has a darker hue.

== Distribution and habitat ==
Armillaria mellea is widespread in northern temperate zones. It has been found throughout North America, and in Europe and northern Asia. It has been introduced to South Africa. It grows parasitically on a large number of broadleaf trees. It fruits in dense clusters at the base of trunks or stumps.

== Economics ==
Armillaria mellea poses a significant threat to managed forests, tree plantations, orchards, vineyards, and gardens, which can lead to substantial economic losses due to Armillaria root rot.

== Ecology ==
Armillaria mellea prefers moist soil and lower soil temperatures, as soil temperatures exceeding 79 °F (26 °C) can inhibit its growth. It can withstand extreme temperatures, such as forest fires, due to the protection of the soil. It is found in many kinds of landscapes, including gardens, parks, vineyards, tree production areas, and natural landscapes.

Armillaria mellea typically is symbiotic with hardwood trees and conifers, including orchards, planted forests, vineyards, and a few herbaceous plants. It infects new hosts through rhizomorphs and basidiospores. It is rare for basidiospores to be successful in infecting new hosts and often colonize woody debris instead, but rhizomorphs, however, can grow up to ten feet long in order to find a new host.

There are few signs, and they are often difficult to observe. The most prominent sign is honey-coloured mushrooms at the base of the infected plant. Additional signs include white, fan-shaped mycelia and black rhizomorphs with diameters between 1/32 and 1/8 inch (0.8 and 3.2 mm). These usually are not as noticeable because they occur beneath the bark and in the soil, respectively. Rhizomorphs and mycelial fans are more reliable indicators of Armillaria because the mushrooms can be easily mistaken for those of other species. Additionally, the mushrooms are not consistently present and, when they do occur, remain for only short durations. The symptoms are much more numerous, including slower growth, dieback of branches, yellowing foliage, rotted wood at base and/or roots, external cankers, cracking bark, bleeding stem, leaf wilting, defoliation, and rapid death. Leaf wilting, defoliation, and dieback occur after the destruction of the cambium. Symptoms typically develop gradually, resulting in increased dieback and a reduction in yield as the disease progresses.

It is one of the most common causes of death in trees and shrubs in both natural and cultivated habitats, and cause steady and substantial losses.

"A.mellea" has been recorded as food of animals such as the adults of the pleasing fungus beetles Tritoma biguttata biguttata, Tritoma atriventris and T.humeralis (which may be conspecific), and T.mimetica, which occasionally eat it. However, it is not quite clear whether such records in older sources refer to this honey mushroom species in its present more restricted delimitation, or to some other species of Armillaria or even related genera such as Desarmillaria.

=== Disease cycle ===
Armillaria mellea infects both through basidiospore and penetration of host species by rhizomorphs which can grow up to 1 meter (39 in) long per year to find new, living tissue to infect. However, infection of living host tissue through basidiospores is quite rare. Two basidiospores must germinate and fuse to be viable and produce mycelium. In the late summer and autumn, Armillaria mellea produces mushrooms with notched gills, a ring near the cap base, and a white to golden color. They do not always appear, but when they do they can be found on both living and dead trees near the ground. These mushrooms produce and release the sexually created basidiospore which is dispersed by the wind. This is the only spore-bearing phase. The fungus overwinters as either rhizomorphs or vegetative mycelium. Infected wood is weakened through decay in roots and tree base after destruction of the vascular cambium and underlying wood.

Trees become infected when rhizomorphs growing through the soil encounter uninfected roots. Alternatively, when infected roots come into contact with uninfected ones the fungal mycelium may grow across. The rhizomorphs invade the trunk, growing between the bark and the wood and causing wood decay, growth reduction and mortality. Trees that are already under stress are more likely to be attacked but healthy trees may also be parasitized. When rhizomorphs encounter a new, healthy host, mycelium grows over the surface of the roots. The host may remain asymptomatic for a period; however, under stress conditions, the fungus rapidly penetrates the bark and induces disease. The foliage becomes sparse and discoloured, twig growth slows down and branches may die back. When they are attacked, the Douglas-fir, western larch and some other conifers often produce an extra large crop of cones shortly before dying. Coniferous trees also tend to ooze resin from infected areas, which often become encrusted with resin, soil, and occasionally fungal tissue. Whereas broad-leaved trees sometimes develop sunken cankers covered with loose bark that can contain gum or other exudates. A growth of fruiting bodies near the base of the trunk confirms the suspicion of Armillaria root rot.

In 1893, the American mycologist Charles Horton Peck reported finding Armillaria fruiting bodies that were "aborted", in a similar way to specimens of Entoloma abortivum. It was not until 1974 that Roy Watling showed that the aborted specimens included cells of both Armillaria mellea and Entoloma abortivum. He thought that the Armillaria was parasitizing the Entoloma, a plausible hypothesis given its pathogenic behaviour. However, a 2001 study by Czederpiltz, Volk and Burdsall showed that the Entoloma was in fact the microparasite. The whitish-grey malformed fruit bodies known as carpophoroids were the result of E. abortivum hyphae penetrating the Armillaria and disrupting its normal development.

The main part of the fungus is underground where a mat of mycelial threads may extend for great distances. The rhizomorphs of are initiated from mycelium into multicellular apices of rhizomorphs, which are multicellular vegetative organs that exclude soil from the interior of the rhizomorph tissues. The rhizomorphs spread through far greater distances through the ground than the mycelium. The rhizomorphs are black in this species. The fungal body is not bioluminescent but its mycelia and rhizomorphs are luminous when in active growth. A. mellea producing rhizomorphs is parasitic on woody plants of many species, including especially shrubs, hardwood and evergreen trees. In one example, A. mellea spread by rhizomorphs from an initially infected tree killed 600 trees in a prune orchard in 6 years. Each infected tree was immediately adjacent to an already infected one, the spread by rhizomorphs through the tree roots and soil.

=== Management ===
There are fungicides or management practices that will kill A. mellea after infection without damaging the infected plant, but these practices are still being studied. There are practices that can extend the life of the plant and prevent further spreading. The best way to extend the plant life is to improve the host condition through supplemental watering and fertilization. To prevent further spread, it is recommended to regulate irrigation to avoid water stress, keep the root collar dry, control defoliating pathogens, remove stumps, fertilize adequately, avoid physical root damage and soil compaction, and to not plant trees that are especially susceptible to the disease in places where A. mellea has been recorded. There is also some evidence that biological control using the fungus genus Trichoderma may help. Trichoderma is a predator of A. mellea and is often found in woodchips. Therefore, chipping or grinding dead and infected roots will give Trichoderma its preferred habitat and help it proliferate. Solarization will also create an ideal habitat as dry soil and higher soil temperatures are preferable for Trichoderma but poor conditions for A. mellea.

== Hosts ==
Armillaria mellea is capable of infecting hundreds of woody plant species, including trees, hedges, shrubs, and vines. Susceptibility to infection varies among species, with some being more commonly affected than others. Common genera that can be infected include Abies, Acer, Aesculus, Alnus, Berberis, Carpinus, Catalpa, Cornus, Corylus, Cupressus, Cydonia, Eucalyptus, Fagus, Ficus, Forsythia, Fuchsia, Ginkgo, Hedera, Hibiscus, Hydrangea, Ilex, Jasminum, Juniperus, Lavandula, Lonicera, Magnolia, Malus, Morus, Olea, Picea, Pinus, Populus, Punica, Rhamnus, Rhododendron, Rhus, Ribes, Rosa, Rosmarinus, Salix, Salvia, Solanum, Spiraea, Symphoricarpos, Taxus, Thuja, Tilia, Viburnum, Vitis, Weigela, along with numerous other species.

=== Grapes ===
Armillaria root rot frequently causes fatal outcomes in grapevines. The pathogen infects the roots and root crown, destroying the cambium layer and decaying xylem tissue, which results in white rot. The presence of rhizomorphs and mycelial fans is a more reliable indicator of Armillaria infection than mushrooms, since mushrooms can be confused with other species, may not appear annually, and are present only briefly. Grapevines infected with Armillaria mellea often display shriveled berries. Rapid desiccation of leaves and berries, followed by vine death after veraison and before harvest, may occur in plants that previously showed moderate symptoms.

Outbreaks in vineyards typically begin at a single infection point and expand outward in a circular pattern. Grapevines at the center of the infection exhibit more severe symptoms or die more rapidly than those at the periphery, which may remain asymptomatic. Infection often occurs through contact with previously infected woody material in the soil, especially in areas formerly occupied by Quercus species, as the fungus can persist as mycelium for years within woody debris.

The fungus persists on both living and dead grapevine root tissues, which facilitates its spread and accelerates plant degradation under environmental stress. Severely stunted shoots that are not killed by the disease rarely survive through dormancy and budbreak. Grapevines typically die when approximately half of the root collar has been girdled, impeding adequate water transport. Although several Armillaria species can cause the disease, most infections are attributed to A. mellea, which is currently the only known species to kill grapevines, although this may be due to ongoing challenges in the taxonomy of Armillaria species.

== Cultivation ==
Cultivation of A. mellea started with cultivation of its mycellia, which is used to support the cultivation of Gastrodia elata, a non-photosynthetic species of orchid used in traditional Chinese medicine. This kind of cultivation has been present since 1994 and uses pieces of wood inoculated with the fungus. In 2017, farmers from Heilongjiang succeeded in producing fruiting bodies (mushrooms) through cultivation. Two methods were possible, one using wood pieces, the other using bagged media. By 2019, the spent myceliated wood from Gastrodia cultivation is routinely used to seed new wood for mushroom production.

== Uses ==
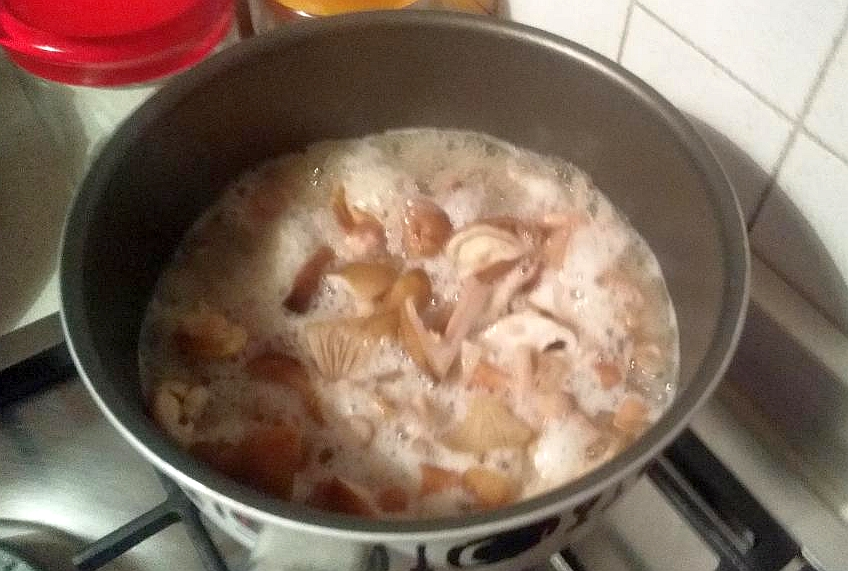
Parboiling honey fungus

Armillaria mellea is considered a good edible mushroom, but is not preferred by some, and the tough stalks are usually excluded. They are best collected when young and thoroughly cooked. Specimens such as those growing on buckeye or hemlock can cause gastrointestinal upset.

The mushrooms have a taste that has been described as slightly sweet and nutty, with a texture ranging from chewy to crunchy, depending on the method of preparation. Parboiling mushrooms before consuming removes the bitter taste present in some specimens and may reduce the amount of gastrointestinal irritants. According to one guide, they must be cooked before eating. Drying the mushrooms preserves and intensifies their flavour, although reconstituted mushrooms tend to be tough to eat. The mushrooms can also be pickled and roasted.

Different nutritional parameters of A. mellea, like protein, carbohydrate, fat, amino acid and crude have been studied. The fruit body contains large amounts of carbohydrates including polysaccharides such as glucans and glycogen, monosaccharides and disaccharides (such as trehalose), sugar, alcohols (such as manitol) and chitin. The mushroom is rich in protein and carbohydrate but is low amount of fat which could serve a proper diet for persons who sufferer from hypertension and atherosclerosis. Furthermore, due to the presence of high level of crude fiber it could help to control diabetes and obesity.

The mushrooms also may have been used medicinally by indigenous peoples as a laxative.

== Chemistry ==
Several bioactive compounds have been isolated and identified from the fruit bodies. The triterpenes 3β-hydroxyglutin-5-ene, friedelane-2α,3β-diol, and friedelin were reported in 2011. Indole compounds include tryptamine, L-tryptophan and serotonin.

The fungus produces cytotoxic compounds known as melleolides. Melleolides are made from orsellinic acid and protoilludane sesquiterpene alcohols via esterification. A polyketide synthase gene, termed ArmB, was identified in the genome of the fungus, which was found expressed during melleolide production. The gene shares c. 42% similarity with the orsellinic acid synthase gene (OrsA) in Aspergillus nidulans. Characterization of the gene proved it to catalyze orsillinic acid in vitro. It is a non-reducing iterative type-1 polyketide synthase. Co-incubation of free orsellinic acid with alcohols and ArmB showed cross-coupling activity. Therefore, the enzyme has transesterification activity. Other auxiliary factors are suspected to control substrate specificity. Additionally, halogen modifications have been observed. Overexpression of annotated halogenases (termed ArmH1-5) and characterization of the subsequent enzymes revealed in all five enzymes the chlorination of mellolide F. In vitro reactions of free-standing substrates showed that the enzymes do not require auxiliary carrier proteins for substrate delivery.

== See also ==
- Forest pathology
- List of Armillaria species
- List of bioluminescent fungi
