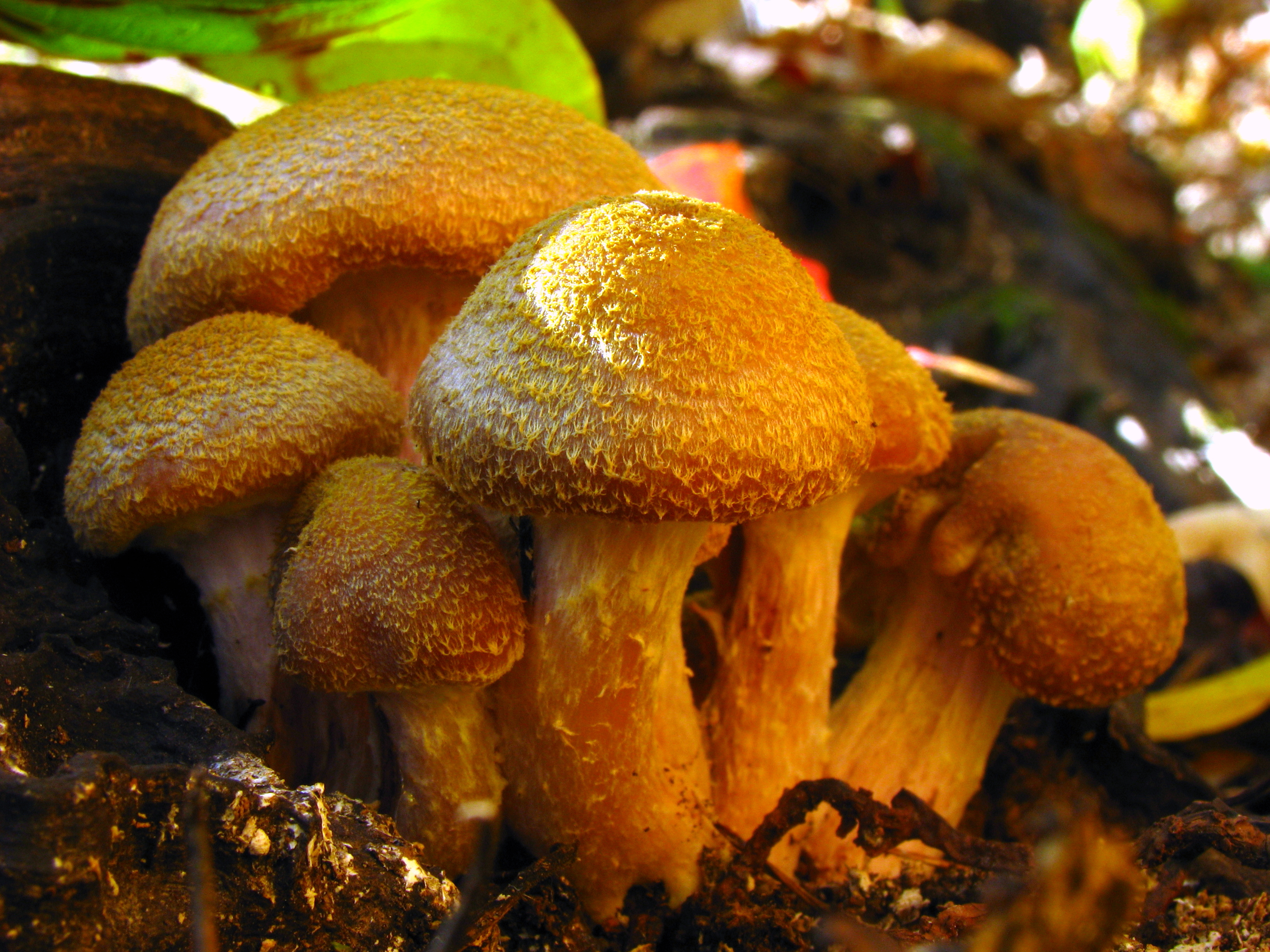

Scientific classification
- Kingdom: Fungi
- Division: Basidiomycota
- Class: Agaricomycetes
- Order: Agaricales
- Family: Physalacriaceae
- Genus: Armillaria
- Species: A. gallica

Binomial name
- Armillaria gallica Marxm. & Romagn. (1987)

Synonyms
- Agaricus melleus f. luteoannulata Brunaud (1886); Armillaria gallica var. marinensis Blanco-Dios (2017)

= Armillaria gallica =

Species of fungus

Armillaria gallica Mycological characteristics
- Gills on hymenium
- Cap is convex
- Hymenium is adnate
- Stipe has a ring
- Spore print is white
- Ecology is saprotrophic or parasitic
- Edibility is edible

Armillaria gallica (synonymous with A. bulbosa and A. lutea) is a species of honey mushroom in the family Physalacriaceae of the order Agaricales. The species is a common and ecologically important wood-decay fungus that can live as a saprobe, or as an opportunistic parasite in weakened tree hosts to cause root or butt rot. It is found in temperate regions of Asia, North America, and Europe. The species forms fruit bodies singly or in groups in soil or rotting wood. The fungus has been inadvertently introduced to South Africa. Armillaria gallica has had a confusing taxonomy, due in part to historical difficulties encountered in distinguishing between similar Armillaria species. The fungus received international attention in the early 1990s when an individual colony living in a Michigan forest was reported to cover an area of 15 hectares (37 acres), weigh at least 9.5 tonnes (9,500 kg; 21,000 lb), and be 1,500 years old. This individual is popularly known as the "humongous fungus", and is a tourist attraction and inspiration for an annual mushroom-themed festival in Crystal Falls. Recent studies have revised the fungus's age to 2,500 years and its size to about 400 tonnes (400,000 kg; 880,000 lb), four times the original estimate.

Armillaria gallica is a largely subterranean fungus, and it produces fruit bodies that are up to about 10 cm (3.9 in) in diameter, yellow-brown, and covered with small scales. On the underside of the caps are gills that are white to creamy or pale orange. The stem may be up to 10 cm (3.9 in) long, with a white cobwebby ring that divides the color of the stem into pale orange to brown above, and lighter-colored below. The fungus can develop an extensive system of underground root-like structures, called rhizomorphs, that help it to efficiently decompose dead wood in temperate broadleaf and mixed forests. It has been the subject of considerable scientific research due to its importance as a plant pathogen, its ability to bioluminesce, its unusual life cycle, and its ability to form large and long-lived colonies.

== Phylogeny, taxonomy and naming ==
- - - - - - A. solidipes
          - A. gemina
        - - - - A. calvescens
              - - A. gallica (ST22)
                - A. gallica (ST23)
            - A. gallica (M70)
          - - A. sinapina
            - A. cepistipes
          - NABS X
          - A. nabsnona
      - A. tabescens
      - A. mellea

Phylogeny and relationships of A. gallica and related North American species based on amplified fragment length polymorphism data (UPGMA). SY22, ST23, and M70 are A. gallica specimens collected from Michigan, Wisconsin, and British Columbia, respectively.

Confusion has surrounded the nomenclature and taxonomy of the species now known as Armillaria gallica, paralleling that surrounding the genus Armillaria. The type species, Armillaria mellea, was until the 1970s believed to be a pleiomorphic species with a wide distribution, variable pathogenicity, and one of the broadest host ranges known for the fungi. In 1973, Veikko Hintikka reported a technique to distinguish between Armillaria species by growing them together as single spore isolates on petri dishes and observing changes in the morphology of the cultures. Using a similar technique, Kari Korhonen showed in 1978 that the European Armillaria mellea species complex could be separated into five reproductively isolated species, which he named "European Biological Species" (EBS) A through E. About the same time, the North American A. mellea was shown to be ten different species (North American Biological Species, or NABS I through X); NABS VII was demonstrated shortly after to be the same species as EBS E. Because several research groups had worked with this widely distributed species, it was assigned several different names.

The species that Korhonen called EBS B was named A. bulbosa by Helga Marxmüller in 1982, as it was thought to be equivalent to Armillaria mellea var. bulbosa, first described by Jean Baptiste Barla (Joseph Barla) in 1887, and later raised to species status by Josef Velenovský in 1927. In 1973, the French mycologist Henri Romagnesi, unaware of Velenovský's publication, published a description of the species he called Armillariella bulbosa, based on specimens he had found near Compiègne and Saint-Sauveur-le-Vicomte in France. These specimens were later demonstrated to be the same species as the EBS E of Korhonen; EBS B was later determined to be A. cepistipes. Therefore, the name A. bulbosa was a misapplied name for EBS E. In 1987 Romagnesi and Marxmüller renamed EBS E to Armillaria gallica. Another synonym, A. lutea, had originally been described by Claude Casimir Gillet in 1874, and proposed as a name for EBS E. Although the name had priority due to its early publication date, it was rejected as a nomen ambiguum because of a lack of supporting evidence to identify the fungus, including a specimen, type locality, and incomplete collection notes. A. inflata (Velenovský, 1920) may represent another synonym, but the type specimens were not preserved, so it is considered a dubious name (nomen dubium). As of 2010, both the Index Fungorum and MycoBank consider Armillaria gallica Marxm. & Romagn. to be the current name, with A. bulbosa and A. lutea as synonyms.

Phylogenetic analysis of North American Armillaria species based on analysis of amplified fragment length polymorphism data suggests that A. gallica is most closely related to A. sinapina, A. cepistipes, and A. calvescens. These results are similar to those reported in 1992 that compared sequences of nuclear ribosomal DNA.

The specific epithet gallica is botanical Latin for "French" (from Gallia, "Gaul"), and refers to the type locality. The prior name bulbosa is Latin for "bulb-bearing, bulbous" (from bulbus and the suffix -osa). Armillaria is derived from the Latin armilla, or "bracelet".

== Description ==
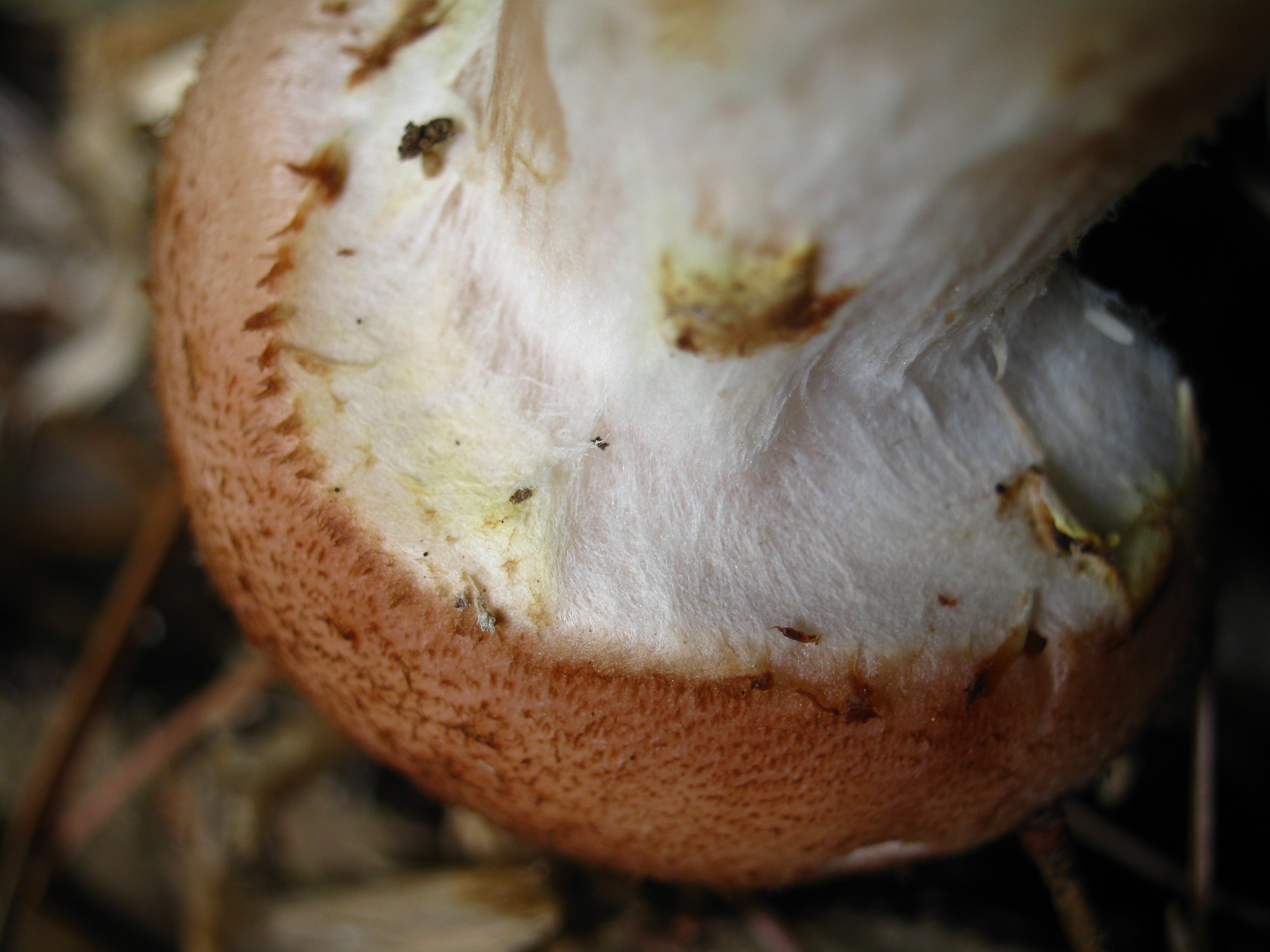
Young fruit bodies have a cottony partial veil that protects the developing gills.

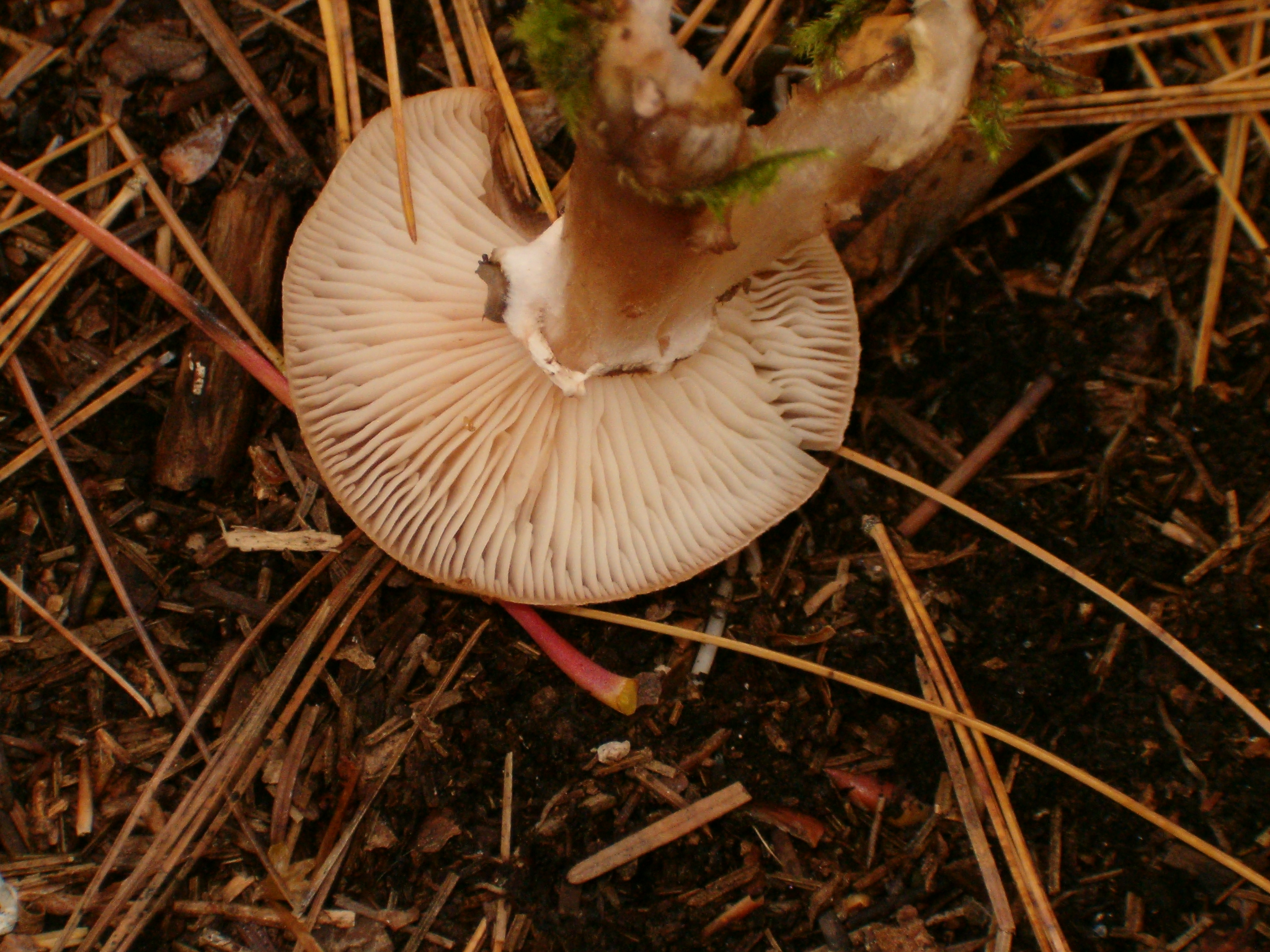
Mature gills

The fruit bodies of Armillaria gallica have caps that are 2.5–9.5 cm (1.0–3.7 in) broad, and depending on their age, may range in shape from conical to convex to flattened. The caps are brownish-yellow to brown when moist, often with a darker-colored center; the color tends to fade upon drying. The cap surface is covered with slender fibers (same color as the cap) that are erect, or sloping upwards.

When the fruit bodies are young, the underside of the caps have a cottony layer of tissue stretching from the edge of the cap to the stem—a partial veil—which serves to protect the developing gills. As the cap grows in size the membrane is eventually pulled away from the cap to expose the gills. The gills have an adnate (squarely attached) to somewhat decurrent (extending down the length of the stem) attachment to the stem. They are initially white, but age to a creamy or pale orange covered with rust-colored spots. The stem is 4–10 cm (1.6–3.9 in) long and 0.6–1.8 cm (0.24–0.71 in) thick, and almost club-shaped with the base up to 1.3–2.7 cm (0.5–1.1 in) thick. Above the level of the ring, the stem is pale orange to brown, while below it is whitish or pale pink, becoming grayish-brown at the base. The ring is positioned about 0.4–0.9 cm (0.16–0.35 in) below the level of the cap, and may be covered with yellowish to pale-brownish woolly cottony mycelia. The base of the stem is attached to rhizomorphs, black root-like structures 1–3 mm in diameter. While the primary function of the below-ground mycelia is to absorb nutrients from the soil, the rhizomorphs serve a more exploratory function, to locate new food bases.

=== Microscopic features ===
When the spores are seen in deposit, such as with a spore print, they appear whitish. They have an ellipsoid or oblong shape, usually contain an oil droplet, and have dimensions of 7–8.5 by 5–6 μm. The spore-bearing cells, the basidia, are club-shaped, four-spored (rarely two-spored), and measure 32–43 by 7–8.7 μm. Other cells present in the fertile hymenium include the cheilocystidia (cystidia present on the edge of a gill), which are club-shaped, roughly cylindrical and 15–25 by 5.0–12 μm. Cystidia are also present on the stem (called caulocystidia), and are broadly club-shaped, measuring 20–55 by 11–23 μm. The cap cuticle is made of hyphae that are irregularly interwoven and project upward to form the scales seen on the surface. The hyphae that make up the surface scales typically measure 26–88 μm long by 11–27 μm thick and can be covered with a crust of pigment. Clamp connections are present in the hyphae of most tissues.

=== Edibility ===
Like all Armillaria species, A. gallica is considered edible. Thorough cooking is usually recommended, as the raw mushroom tastes acrid when fresh or undercooked. One author advises to consume only a small portion initially, as some people may experience an upset stomach. The taste is described as "mild to bitter", and the odor "sweet", or reminiscent of camembert cheese.

=== Similar species ===
Armillaria calvescens is rather similar in appearance, and can only be reliably distinguished from A. gallica by observing microscopic characteristics. A. calvescens has a more northern distribution, and in North America, is rarely found south of the Great Lakes. A. mellea has a thinner stem than A. gallica, but can be more definitively distinguished by the absence of clamps at the base of the basidia. Similarly, A. cepistipes and A. gallica are virtually identical in appearance (especially older fruit bodies), and are identified by differences in geographical distribution, host range, and microscopic characteristics. Molecular methods have been developed to discriminate between the two species by comparing DNA sequences in the gene coding translation elongation factor 1-alpha.

=== Metabolites ===
Armillaria gallica can produce cyclobutane-containing metabolites such as arnamiol, a natural product that is classified as a sesquiterpenoid aryl ester. Although the specific function of arnamiol is not definitively known, similar chemicals present in other Armillaria species are thought to play a role in inhibiting the growth of antagonistic bacteria or fungi, or in killing cells of the host plant prior to infection.

=== Bioluminescence ===
The mycelia and fruiting bodies of Armillaria gallica are known to be bioluminescent. Experiments have shown that the intensity of the luminescence is enhanced when the mycelia are disturbed during growth. Bioluminescence is caused by the action of luciferases, enzymes that produce light by the oxidation of a luciferin (a pigment). The biological purpose of bioluminescence in fungi is not definitively known, although several hypotheses have been suggested: it may help attract insects to help with spore dispersal, it may be a by-product of other biochemical functions, or it may help deter heterotrophs that might consume the fungus.

== Humongous fungus ==
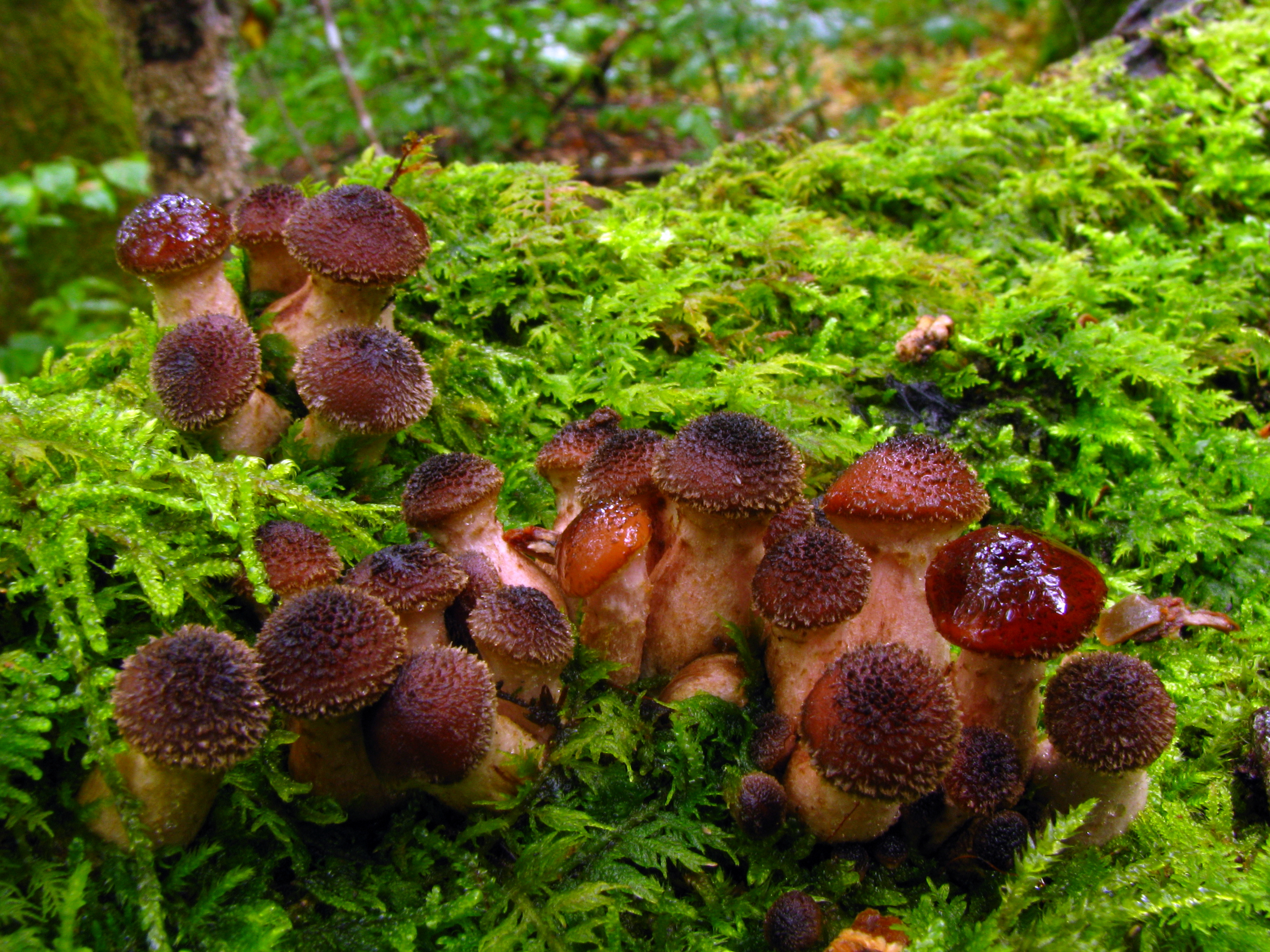
The fruit bodies—the visible manifestation of A. gallica—belie an extensive underground network of mycelia.

Researchers reported finding Armillaria gallica in the Upper Peninsula of Michigan in the early 1990s, during an unrelated research project to study the possible biological effects of extremely low frequency radio stations, which were being investigated as a means to communicate with submerged submarines. In one particular forest stand, Armillaria-infected oak trees had been harvested, and their stumps were left to rot in the field. Later, when red pines were planted in the same location, the seedlings were killed by the fungus, identified as A. gallica (then known as A. bulbosa). Using molecular genetics, they determined that the underground mycelia of one individual fungal colony covered 15 ha (37 acres), weighing over 9,500 kilograms (21,000 lb), with an estimated age of 1,500 years. The analysis used restriction fragment length polymorphism (RFLP) and random amplification of polymorphic DNA (RAPD) to examine isolates collected from fruit bodies and rhizomorphs (underground aggregations of fungal cells that resemble plant roots) along 1-kilometer (0.6 mi) transects in the forest. The 15-hectare area yielded isolates that had identical mating type alleles and mitochondrial DNA restriction fragment patterns; this degree of genetic similarity indicated that the samples were all derived from a single genetic individual, or clone, that had reached its size through vegetative growth. In their conclusion, the authors noted: "This is the first report estimating the minimum size, mass, and age of an unambiguously defined fungal individual. Although the number of observations for plants and animals is much greater, members of the fungal kingdom should now be recognized as among the oldest and largest organisms on earth." After the Nature paper was published, major media outlets from around the world visited the site where the specimens were found; as a result of this publicity, the individual acquired the common name "humongous fungus". There was afterward some scholarly debate as to whether the fungus qualified to be considered in the same category as other large organisms such as the blue whale or the giant redwood.

The fungus has since become a popular tourist attraction in Michigan, and has inspired a "Humongous Fungus Fest" held annually in August in Crystal Falls. The organism was the subject of a Late Show Top Ten List on Late Night with David Letterman, and an advertising campaign by the rental company U-Haul.

== Life cycle and growth ==
The life cycle of A. gallica includes two diploidization–haploidization events. The first of these is the usual process of cell fusion (forming a diploid) followed by meiosis during the formation of haploid basidiospores. The second event is more cryptic and occurs before fruit body formation. In most basidiomycetous fungi, the hyphae of compatible mating types will fuse to form a two-nucleate, or dikaryotic stage; this stage is not observed in Armillaria species, which have cells that are mostly monokaryotic and diploid. Genetic analyses suggest that the dikaryotic mycelia undergo an extra haploidization event prior to fruit body formation to create a genetic mosaic. These regular and repeating haploidization events result in increased genetic diversity, which helps the fungus to adapt to unfavorable changes in environmental conditions, such as drought.

The growth rate of A. gallica rhizomorphs is between 0.3 and 0.6 m (1.0 and 2.0 ft) per year. Population genetic studies of the fungus conducted in the 1990s demonstrated that genetic individuals grow mitotically from a single point of origin to eventually occupy territories that may include many adjacent root systems over large areas (several hectares) of forest floor. Based on the low mutation rates observed in large, long-lived individuals, A. gallica appears to have an especially stable genome. It has also been hypothesized that genetic stability may result from self-renewing mycelial repositories of nuclei with stem cell-like properties.

Specific mechanisms of somatic growth have been proposed to explain how species such as A. gallica keep somatic mutations in check, thus promoting their longevity. The common element of these mechanisms is asymmetric cell division in which a group of cells is maintained that divide infrequently and are thus less prone to replication errors leading to mutations. At the somatic growth front of A. gallica mutation rate was proposed to be kept low by cells dividing infrequently, but giving rise to cells behind the growth front that divide rapidly thus promoting tissue growth although at the expense of a higher mutation rate.

== Habitat and distribution ==
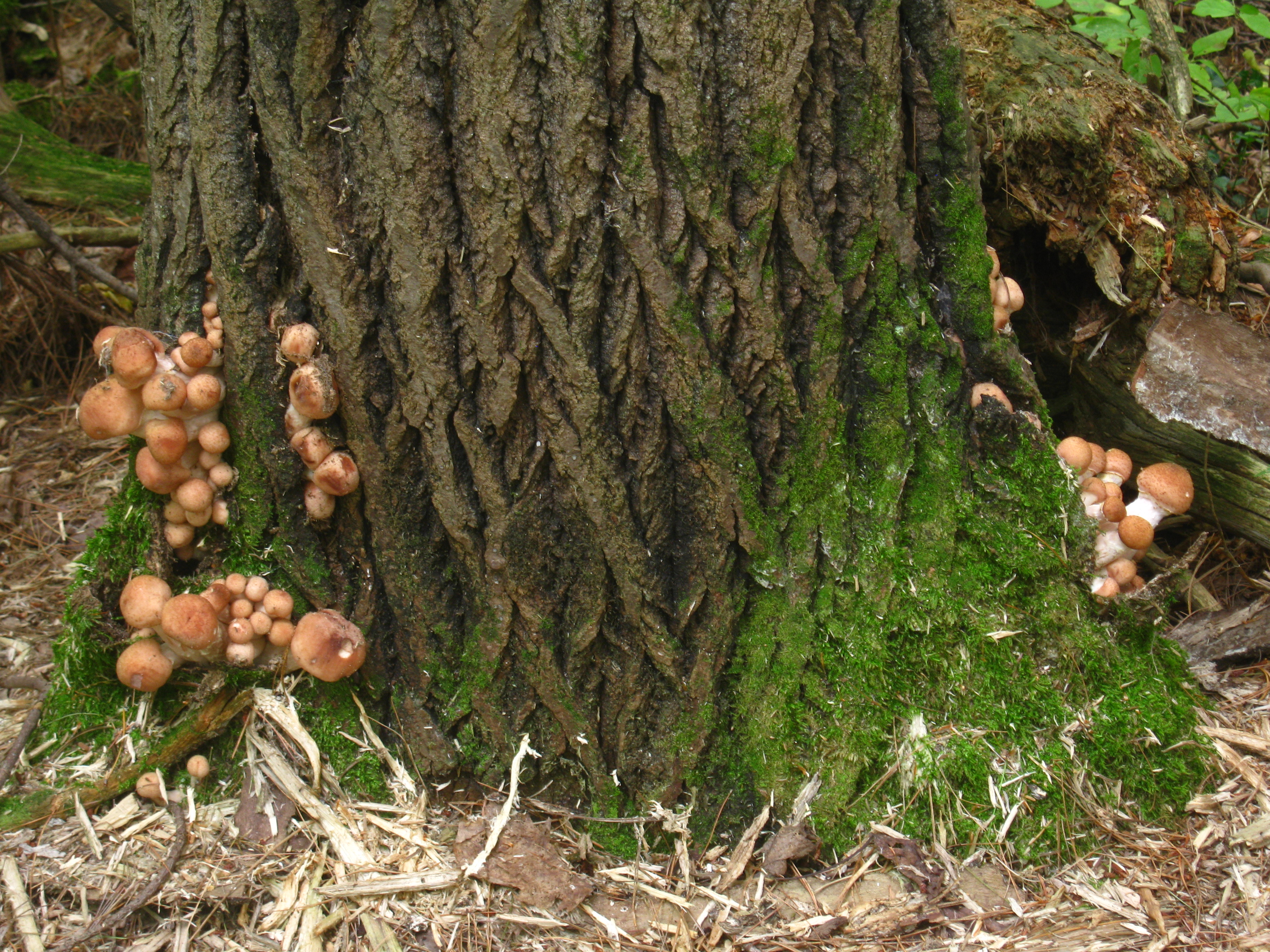
Young fruit bodies growing in clusters at the base of a tree

Armillaria gallica can normally be found on the ground, but sometimes on stumps and logs. Mushrooms that appear to be terrestrial are attached to plant roots underneath the surface. It is widely distributed and has been collected in North America, Europe, and Asia (China, Iran, and Japan). The species has also been found in the Western Cape Province of South Africa, where it is thought to have been introduced from potted plants imported from Europe during the early colonization of Cape Town. In Scandinavia, it is absent in areas with very cold climates, like Finland or Norway, but it is found in southern Sweden. It is thought to be the most prevalent low altitude species of Armillaria in Great Britain and France. The upper limits of its altitude vary by region. In the French Massif Central, it is found up to 1,100 m (3,600 ft), while in Bavaria, which has a more continental climate, the upper limit of distribution reaches 600 m (2,000 ft). In Serbian forests, it is the most common Armillaria between elevations of 70 to 1,450 m (230 to 4,760 ft). Field studies suggest that A. gallica prefers sites that are low in organic matter and have high soil pHs.

In North America, it is common east of the Rocky Mountains, but rare in the Pacific Northwest. In California, where it is widely distributed, the fungus is found in a variety of plant communities, including aspen, coastal oak woodland, Douglas Fir, Klamath mixed conifer, montane hardwood, montane hardwood-conifer, montane riparian, Redwood, Sierran mixed conifer, valley oak woodland, valley-foothill riparian, and White Fir. It was found to be the most common Armillaria species in hardwood and mixed oak forests in western Massachusetts.

A Chinese study published in 2001 used the molecular biological technique restriction fragment length polymorphism to analyze the differences in DNA sequence between 23 A. gallica specimens collected from the Northern Hemisphere. The results suggest that based on the restriction fragment length polymorphism patterns observed, there are four global A. gallica subpopulations: the Chinese, European, North American–Chinese, and North American–European geographical lineages. A 2007 study on the northeastern and southwestern Chinese distribution of Armillaria, using fruit body and pure culture morphology, concluded that there are several unnamed species (Chinese biological species C, F, H, J and L) that are similar to the common A. gallica.

== Ecology ==
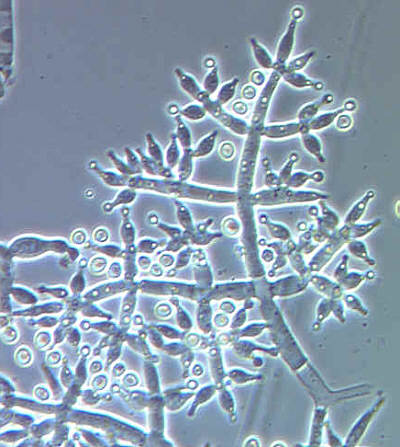
The soil-dwelling fungal pathogen Trichoderma harzianum can parasitize A. gallica rhizomorphs.

Armillaria gallica is a weaker pathogen than the related A. mellea or A. solidipes, and is considered a secondary parasite—typically initiating infection only after the host's defenses have been weakened by insect defoliation, drought, or infection by another fungus. Fungal infection can lead to root rot or butt rot. As the diseased trees die, the wood dries, increasing the chance of catching fire after being struck by lightning. The resulting forest fire may, in turn, kill the species that killed the trees. Plants that are under water stress caused by dry soils or waterlogging are more susceptible to infection by A. gallica. It has been shown to be one of several Armillaria species responsible for widespread mortality of oak trees in the Arkansas Ozarks. The fungus has also been shown to infect Daylily in South Carolina, Northern highbush blueberry (Vaccinium corymbosum) in Italy and vineyards (Vitis species) of Rías Baixas in northwestern Spain. The latter infestation "may be related to the fact that the vineyards from which they were isolated were located on cleared forestry sites". When A. solidipes and A. gallica co-occur in the same forest, infection of root systems by A. gallica may reduce damage or prevent infection from A. solidipes.

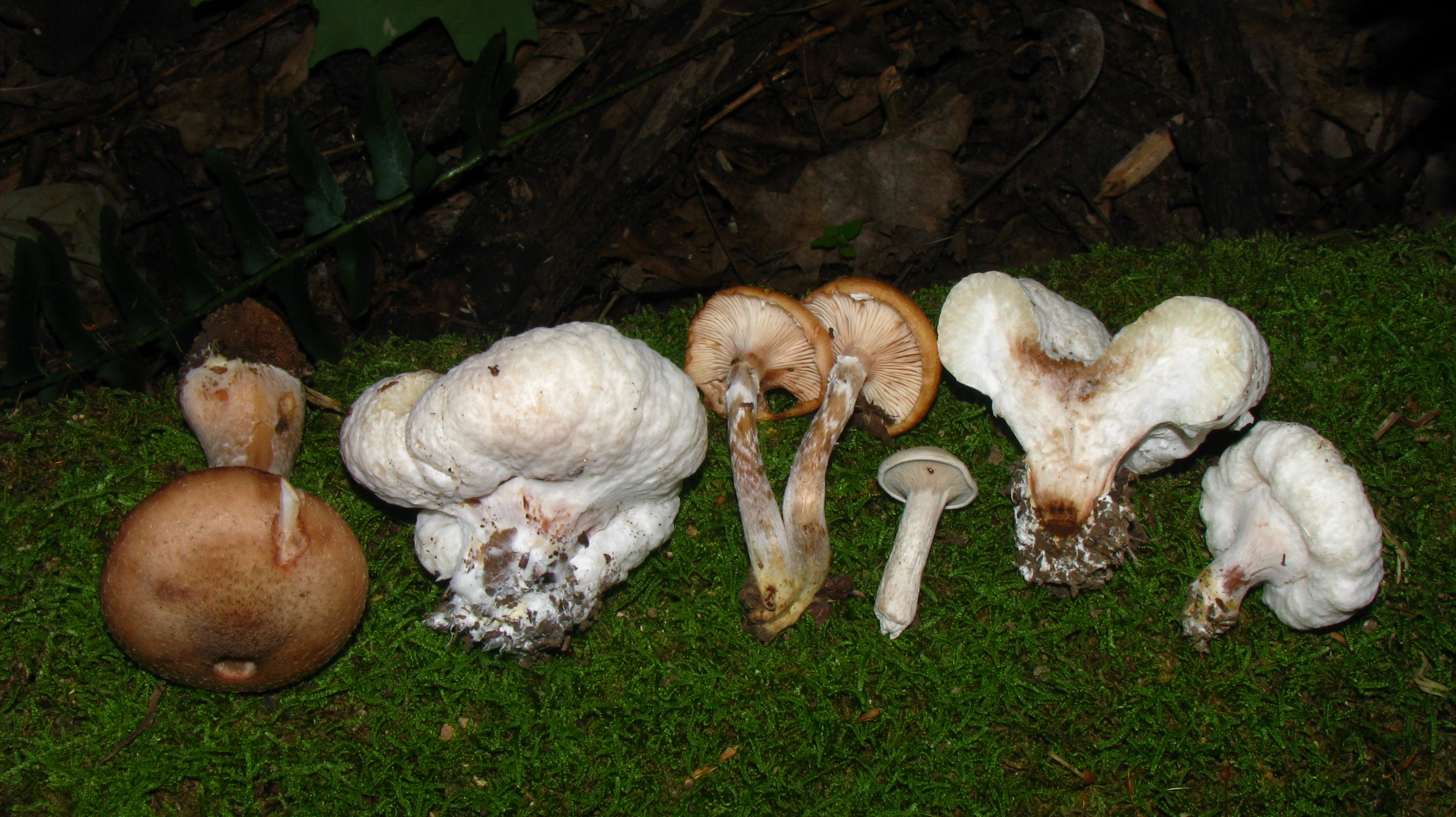
A. gallica may be parasitized by the fungus Entoloma abortivum, resulting in grayish-white, malformed fruit bodies.

Armillaria gallica can develop an extensive subterranean system of rhizomorphs, which helps it to compete with other fungi for resources or to attack trees weakened by other fungi. A field study in an ancient broadleaved woodland in England showed that of five Armillaria species present in the woods, A. gallica was consistently the first to colonize tree stumps that had been coppiced the previous year. Fractal geometry has been used to model the branching patterns of the hyphae of various Armillaria species. Compared to a strongly pathogenic species like A. solidipes, A. gallica has a relatively sparse branching pattern that is thought to be "consistent with a foraging strategy in which acceptable food bases may be encountered at any distance, and which favours broad and divisive distribution of potential inoculum". Because the rhizomorphs form regular networks, mathematical concepts of graph theory have been employed to describe fungal growth and interpret ecological strategies, suggesting that the specific patterns of network attachments allow the fungus "to respond opportunistically to spatially and temporally changing environments".

Armillaria gallica may itself be parasitized by other soil flora. Several species of the fungus Trichoderma, including Trichoderma polysporum, T. harzianum and T. viride, are able to attack and penetrate the outer tissue of A. gallica rhizomorphs and parasitize the internal hyphae. The infected rhizomorphs become devoid of living hyphae about one week after the initial infection. Entoloma abortivum is another fungus that can live parasitically upon A. gallica. The whitish-gray malformed fruit bodies that may result are due to the E. abortivum hyphae penetrating the mushroom and disrupting its normal development.

== See also ==
- List of Armillaria species
- List of bioluminescent fungi
