= Peptidyl-Lys metalloendopeptidase =

Identifiers
- EC no.: 3.4.24.20
- CAS no.: 65979-41-1

Databases
- IntEnz: IntEnz view
- BRENDA: BRENDA entry
- ExPASy: NiceZyme view
- KEGG: KEGG entry
- MetaCyc: metabolic pathway
- PRIAM: profile
- PDB structures: RCSB PDB PDBe PDBsum
Search
- PMC: articles
- PubMed: articles
- NCBI: proteins

Peptidyl-Lys metalloendopeptidase (EC 3.4.24.20, Armillaria mellea neutral proteinase, peptidyllysine metalloproteinase) is an enzyme. This enzyme catalyses the following chemical reaction

Preferential cleavage in proteins: -Xaa-Lys- (in which Xaa may be Pro)

This enzyme is isolated from the honey fungus Armillaria mellea.
