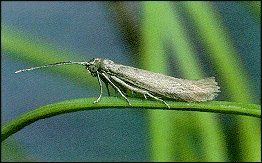

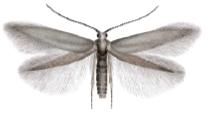

Scientific classification
- Domain: Eukaryota
- Kingdom: Animalia
- Phylum: Arthropoda
- Class: Insecta
- Order: Lepidoptera
- Family: Coleophoridae
- Genus: Coleophora
- Species: C. laricella

Binomial name
- Coleophora laricella (Hübner, 1817)

Synonyms
- Tinea laricella Hübner, 1817; Coleophora nigricornis

= Coleophora laricella =

Western larch case-bearer

Species of moth

Coleophora laricella, the western larch case-bearer, is a moth belonging to the family of case-bearing moths Coleophoridae. It is native to Central and Northern Europe, with its original food source being the European larch or Larix decidua. However, it was introduced to North America in the mid-19th century where it has gained a wide range and become an invasive defoliator of several species of the genus Larix, particularly the western larch Larix occidentalis and the tamarack larch Larix laricina.

== Life cycle ==
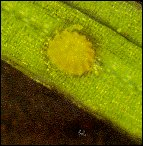
C. laricella egg on a needle. Note the characteristic ridges.

Coleophora laricella produces one generation per year with four life stages egg, larva (with four instars, or growth stages), pupa and adult.

=== Egg ===
Adult females produce 50–70 eggs, deposited one at a time on the needles of the larch. New eggs are a bright yellow colour, but they later turn burnished red. Eggs have 12 to 14 ridges extending from the top to the base of the egg. In areas with dense C. laricella infestations, females may deposit as many as 10 eggs per needle. Eggs hatch in about two weeks.

=== Larva ===
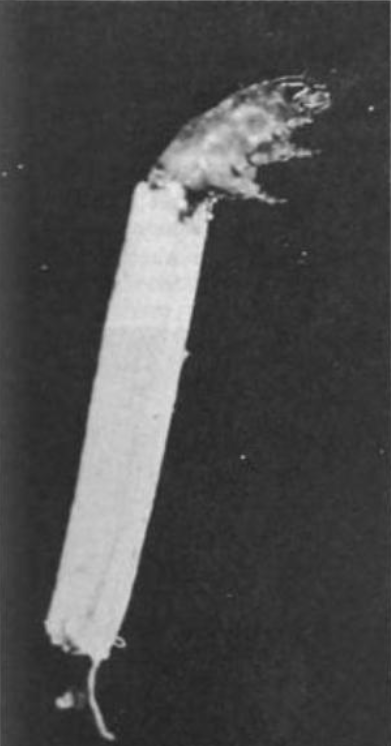
Picture of the embryo of a larch casebearer protruding from its case

Larvae are 5–6 mm long, hatch in July, and pupate about 11 months later. The first and second instar larvae hatch and bore directly from the egg into the needle, and mine inside the needle until August or September, during which the hollowed out needle is converted into the distinctive case. Once the case is created, the larvae progress to the third instar during which the case is fastened to a new needle with silk. The larvae continue to mine the needles discarding old cases as new needles are hollowed out and converted. In October, the larvae prepare for winter by attaching their cases to more solid parts of the tree (twigs, bark, etc.). When spring comes and the larch refoliates the larvae molt into the fourth instar stage and continue mining.

=== Pupa ===
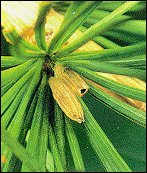
Pupal case of C. laricella

The pupal stages lasts for about two weeks late May or early June. It is marked by the degradation of the needle/case structure to cigar shaped and light gray.

=== Adult ===
Adult moths are small (4–6 mm long with a 6–10 mm wingspan), very narrow and silvery brown in colour. They lack ocelli and maxillary palps. The wings are discal, sharply pointed and "fringed" or tattered looking. They are on the wing from May to July. The head is grey; the antennae grey-whitish, very indistinctly ringed with grey. Forewings are shining grey, hindwings grey.

== Damage ==
Despite the fact that larches drop their needles in the winter and refoliate in the spring, the repeated, seasonal mining behavior performed by the larvae and the pupae of C. laricella is extremely damaging to the host tree. After five years of infestation in most species of Larix the annual growth rate is reduced by 97%. New growth is limited by 50%, which makes for a $3 million yearly loss of stumpage value. Infested trees are also extremely susceptible to other infestations and diseases, such as armillarial root disease, caused by Armillaria sinapina.

== Controls ==
=== Natural controls ===
C. laricella are weather and temperature sensitive and natural fluctuations from year to year can greatly reduce populations. Needle blights which reduce the food supply for larva can also act as a reducing agent. Additionally, native predation and parasitism keep populations in check.

=== Introduced parasitism ===
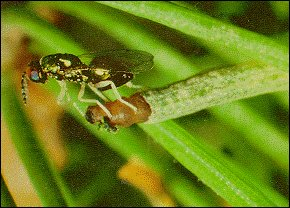
C. laricinellae depositing an egg into a casebearer larva

Where natural controls are not enough to prevent severe defoliation non-native parasites have been introduced. The most important two being Agathis pumila and Chrysocharis laricinellae, which are fly-like European wasps. A. pumila was shown to be effective in eastern North America in the 1930s, but had less success in the west. C. laricinellae, a heartier parasite that only targets C. laricella was introduced in Montana, Idaho, Oregon and Washington, where it has had much greater success. Since 1960 these two species, combined with natural factors have parasitized over 90% of the casebearer populations in some areas.

=== Direct controls ===
In stands of high aesthetic, commercial or conservation value the USDA Forest Service has authorized the use of the insecticide malathion for larval control.
