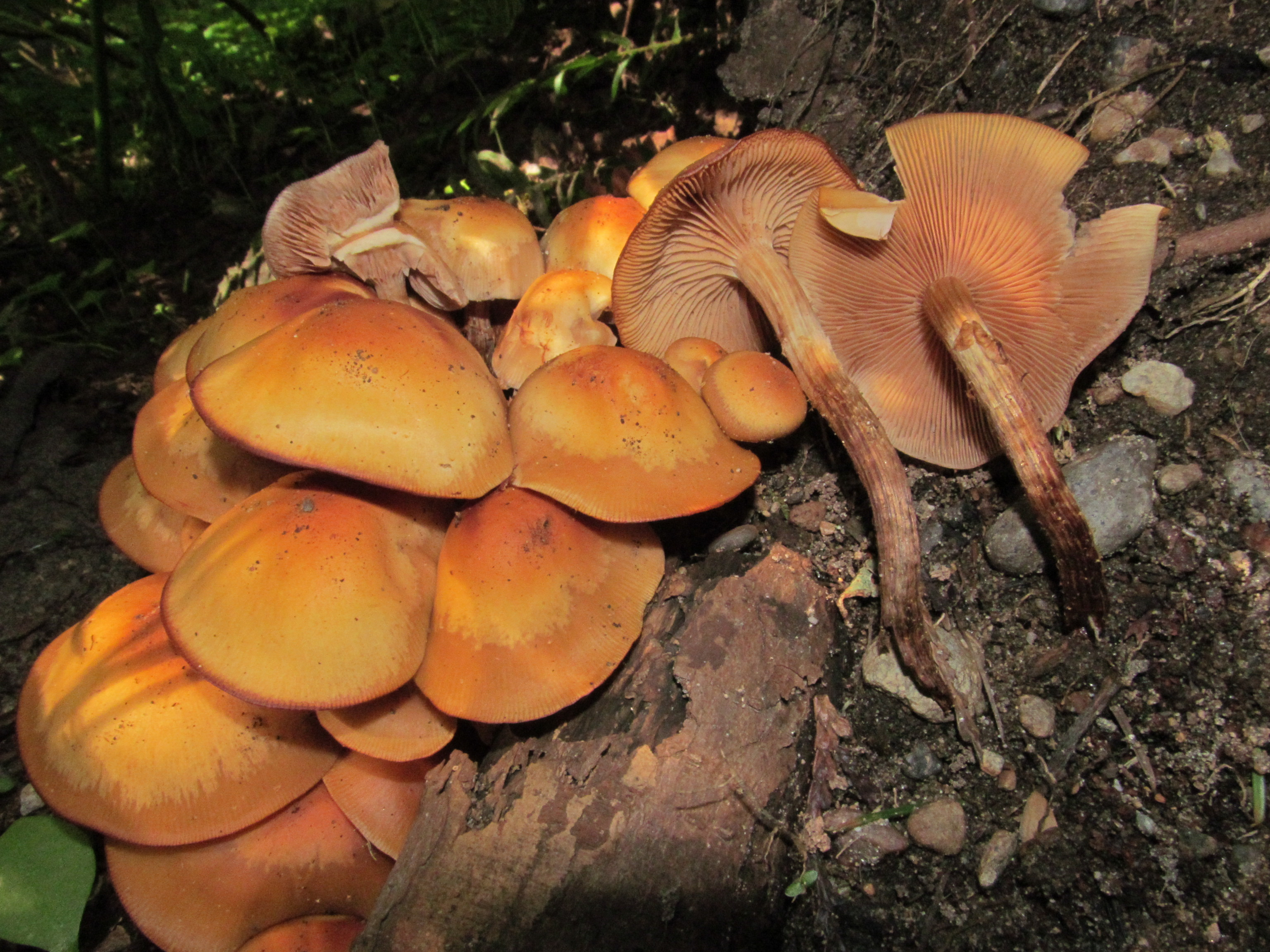

Scientific classification
- Kingdom: Fungi
- Division: Basidiomycota
- Class: Agaricomycetes
- Order: Agaricales
- Family: Physalacriaceae
- Genus: Armillaria
- Species: A. nabsnona

Binomial name
- Armillaria nabsnona T.J.Volk & Burds. (1996)

= Armillaria nabsnona =

Species of fungus

Armillaria nabsnona is a species of fungus in the family Physalacriaceae. The species is found in the west coast of North America, Hawaii, and Japan, where it grows on decaying hardwoods, particularly species of alder. Its fruit bodies have convex to flattened orange-brown caps up to 7 cm (2 3/4 inches) in diameter, brown stipes, and whitish to pinkish-tan gills.

== Taxonomy ==
The species was described scientifically in 1996 by American mycologists Tom Volk and Harold Burdsall. Although the existence of the species as a distinct taxon was known for several years before that, it took several years to collect sufficient specimens and determine an appropriate type collection. The original published description is based on collections found growing on the fallen trunk of Acer macrophyllum in Olympic National Park, Washington, in October 1993. The specific epithet nabsnona is derived from an acronym of "North American Biological Specimen" and nona (ninth).

== Description ==
The fruit bodies have caps that are initially convex before flattening in age, and reach diameters between 4 and 7 cm (1 5/8 and 2 3/4 in). The cap has a smooth surface that becomes sticky when wet. Young specimens can have short, dark hairs on the center. The cap color is reddish to brownish, becoming paler towards the edge, and frequently has darker, irregularly shaped bruise spots. The cap margin appears grooved or furrowed due to the thin flesh (measuring 0.5–1 mm thick) and the gills underneath. The gills have an adnate to somewhat decurrent attachment to the stipe. They are somewhat distantly spaced, 0.75–1 mm wide, and initially white to cream before darkening to pinkish-tan in maturity. The stipe is brownish, darker towards the bottom, and measures 8–10 cm (3 1/8–3 7/8 in) long by 2–3 mm thick, with a broader base measuring 4–5 mm. It has a ring, and whitish patches of cottony mycelium on its surface below the ring. The ring develops from a dense, white and cottony partial veil that becomes ragged as the cap grows, and sometimes persists as a temporary cortina. Rhizomorphs, if present, are black, branched, and 1–2 mm thick.

The spore print is white. Spores are smooth, hyaline (translucent), inamyloid, and have an ovoid to somewhat more or less spherical shape. They typically measure in the range 8–10 by 5.5–6.5 μm. The basidia are club-shaped, four-spored, and 25–35 by 5.5–6 μm, and have a clamp at their bases. Additional basidia may arise from the basal clamp, a branching pattern that distinguishes this species from other Armillaria. This feature becomes less visually prominent as the hymenium matures and neighboring basidia expand and become crowded. The mycelium of the fungus is bioluminescent.

== Habitat and distribution ==
The fruit bodies of Armillaria nabsnona grow in groups, but not clustered together at the base. They are found on hardwood trees (especially Alnus) in riparian areas. Although it fruits most commonly in autumn, it has been recorded fruiting in the spring in Oregon The range of the fungus was originally described as covering roughly the Pacific Northwest region of North America, including the US states of Washington, Oregon, California, Idaho, Alaska, and the Canadian province British Columbia. In 2008 it was recorded in Hawaii; in 2009, it was reported from Hokkaido Island in northern Japan. Japanese researchers have reported a symbiotic association with the orchid Gastrodia elata.

== Similar species ==
Armillaria sinapina is quite close in appearance, with smaller cap scales, and generally growing singly or in small clusters. A. ostoyae is also similar to both A. nabsnona and A. sinapina.

== See also ==
- List of Armillaria species
- List of bioluminescent fungi
