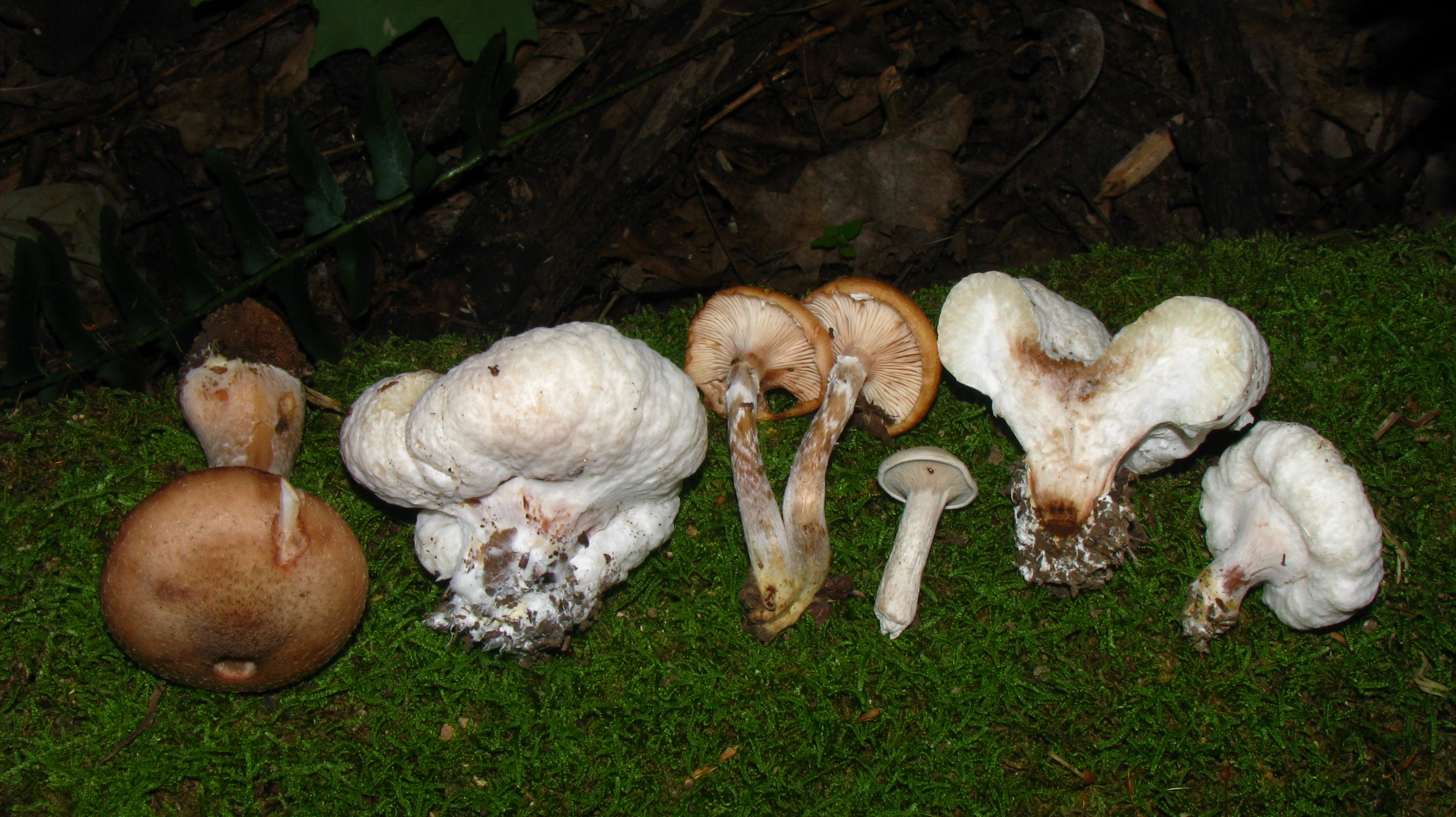
- Entoloma abortivum parasitizing the fruit bodies of Armillaria gallica

Scientific classification
- Kingdom: Fungi
- Division: Basidiomycota
- Class: Agaricomycetes
- Order: Agaricales
- Family: Entolomataceae
- Genus: Entoloma
- Species: E. abortivum

Binomial name
- Entoloma abortivum (Berk. & M.A. Curtis) Donk (1949)

Synonyms
- Agaricus abortivus Berk. & M.A.Curtis (1859); Clitopilus abortivus (Berk. & M.A.Curtis) Sacc. Rhodophyllus abortivus (Berk. & M.A.Curtis) Singer (1969)

= Entoloma abortivum =

Species of fungus

Entoloma abortivum
- Mycological characteristics
- Gills on hymenium
- Cap is depressed
- Hymenium is adnexed
- Stipe is bare
- Spore print is pink
- Ecology is mycorrhizal or parasitic
- Edibility is edible but not recommended

Entoloma abortivum, commonly known as the aborted entoloma or shrimp of the woods, is a mushroom in the Entolomataceae family of fungi. First named Clitopilus abortivus by Miles Joseph Berkeley and Moses Ashley Curtis, it was given its current name by the Dutch mycologist Marinus Anton Donk in 1949.

The grayish cap is up to 8 centimetres (3.1 in) wide. The stem is up to 9 cm long and 1.4 cm (1/2 in) thick. The smell is mealy and the spore print is pinkish.

It was once believed that the honey mushroom, Armillaria mellea, was parasitizing the Entoloma, but research has indicated that the inverse is true—the Entoloma parasitizes the honey mushroom. It is rare that a mushroom-forming fungus can parasitize the reproductive structures of another mushroom-forming fungus. There are over 1,500 species of Entolomataceae the family that contains the Entoloma genus and the majority are saprotrophic, meaning they get nutrients from decomposing dead organic material.

In Mexico it is called Totlcoxcatl ('turkey wattle') due to its irregular shape. Caution should be used in identifying the species before eating, with similar species such as Entoloma sinuatum being poisonous.

== See also ==
- List of Entoloma species
