= Armillaria calvescens =

Scientific classification
- Domain: Eukaryota
- Kingdom: Fungi
- Division: Basidiomycota
- Class: Agaricomycetes
- Order: Agaricales
- Family: Physalacriaceae
- Genus: Armillaria
- Species: A. calvescens

Binomial name
- Armillaria calvescens Bérubé & Dessur. (1989)

Species of fungus

Armillaria calvescens is a species of mushroom in the family Physalacriaceae. Similar in appearance to Armillaria gallica, this species is often found on maple in Canada and New England, as well as other hardwoods in the western United States. The mycelium of the fungus is bioluminescent.

== See also ==
- List of Armillaria species
- List of bioluminescent fungi
