= Armillaria root rot =

Fungal tree disease

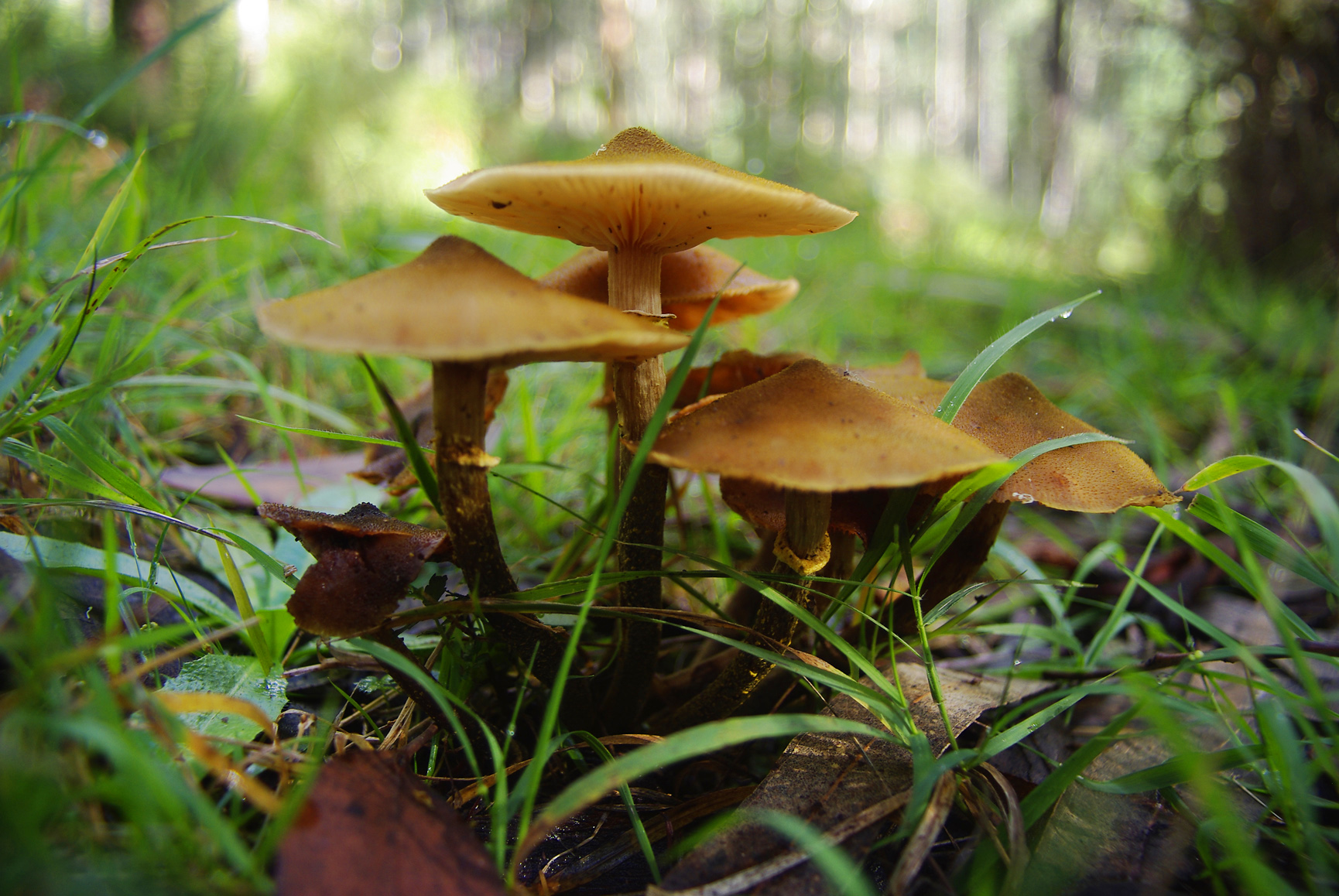
- Armillaria luteobubalina, widespread in Australia, is a primary cause of Eucalyptus tree death and forest dieback resulting from Armillaria root rot.
- Causal agents: Several species of the genus Armillaria
- Hosts: Several tree species

Armillaria root rot is a fungal root rot caused by several different members of the genus Armillaria. The symptoms are variable depending on the host infected, ranging from stunted leaves to chlorotic needles and dieback of twigs and branches. However, all infected hosts display symptoms characteristic of being infected by a white rotting fungus. The most effective ways of management focus on limiting the spread of the fungus, planting resistant species, and removing infected material. This disease poses a threat to the lumber industry as well as affecting recreational areas.

== Hosts and symptoms ==
Because this disease is caused by multiple species within the genus Armillaria, it has an extremely broad host range. Hundreds of trees and shrubs are susceptible to root rot to varying degrees.

While Armillaria is a significant and damaging pathogen of tree hosts, it also has many agronomic hosts such as grapevines, berries, roses, stone fruits, rhododendron, and rosaceous plants, although the fungus is primarily native to areas where it can use forest trees as a host. On hosts such as these, infection causes death of the cambium and further decay of the xylem. Vines or stems from these plants, once infected, may remain a potential source for inoculum for up to ten years and can infect neighboring plants, often via rhizomorphs.

As a result of the multitude of possible hosts, symptoms also range a great deal from one infection to another. All infected hosts do however display symptoms common to white rotting fungi. These include light or bleached wood as a result of the degradation of essential cell wall compounds such as lignin and hemicellulose. In addition to these, the host will show above-ground symptoms due to fungal infection of the vasculature. These include chlorosis in the needles as well as dieback of twigs and branches. The extent of these symptoms varies with the degree of infection as well as the susceptibility of the host. In addition to these symptoms, the trunks of conifers will also exude excess resin in a process known as resinopsis which results in a layer of resin, debris, and fungal tissue forming around infected roots. Deciduous trees occasionally develop sunken cankers but most often fail to exhibit these symptoms on the trunk, and will instead simply display the other symptoms.

In addition to these symptoms, signs of the infectious organism are very evident in the host. Upon removal of the bark, white mycelial mats are visible along with rhizomorphs, a distinctive reproductive structure. Rhizomorphs are black, shoe-string like growth structure that can grow out from the host and grow in the soil to infect nearby hosts. Clusters of mushrooms will also form at the base of the infected tree, indicating an infection. However, fruiting is not consistent year-to-year and the mushrooms frequently resemble other species to the untrained eye. Therefore, the presence of mushrooms should not constitute the only diagnostic indicator when identifying the disease. As the name suggests, the caps of these mushrooms are a honey, or light brown color, and the gills of the mushroom and spore print are white. The stem is typically a mottled white and brown, with a ring on the stem, too. Honey mushrooms are edible, but because of their tendency to look so similar to other species, only the very experienced should collect them. Also, zone lines of melanized fungal cells may be visible within infected wood.

== Disease cycle ==
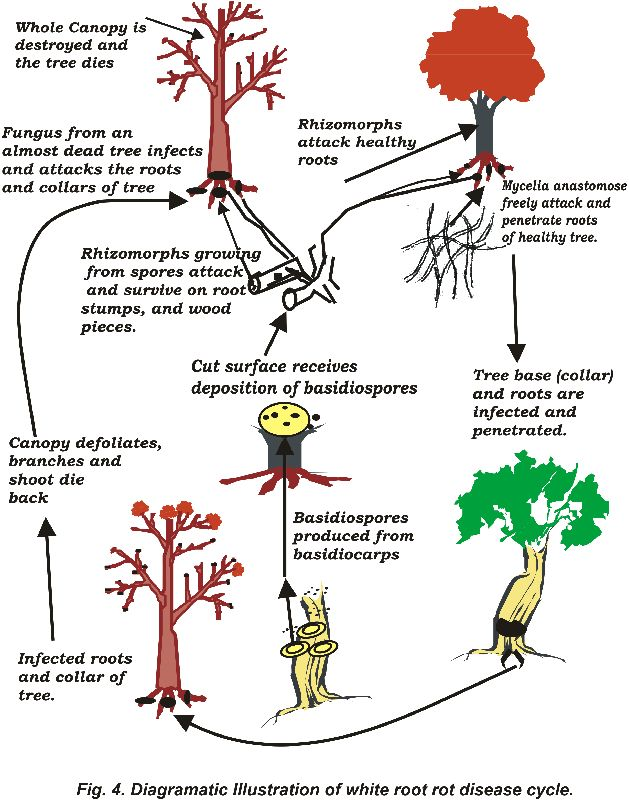
Diagram of white root rot disease cycle

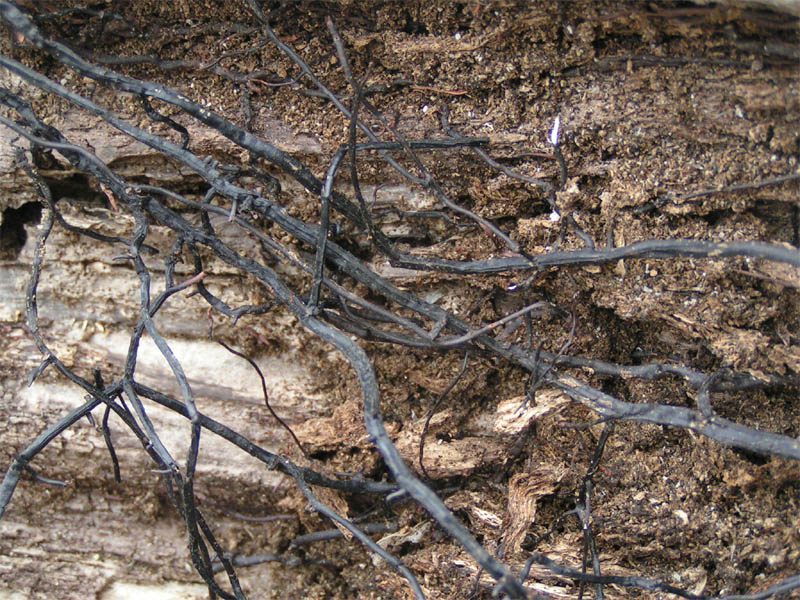
Black root-like rhizomorphs on an unidentified European Armillaria species

For the most part, this fungus exhibits a life cycle characteristic of basidiomycetes. It reproduces sexually with the mating of hyphae and produces a basidiocarp at the base of the infected host. This basidiocarp produces basidiospores that will further infect new hosts. However, Armillaria rarely spreads using this method in nature, possibly as a result of the spores being ineffective. In contrast, it will spread either through rhizomorphs or direct mycelial contact. In the case of mycelial contact, the roots of an infected host grow near enough to a new host that mycelia simply grow onto the new host and infect. Rhizomorphs are string-like masses of hyphae utilized if no new hosts are nearby and spread by probing through the soil towards uninfected roots. Armillaria can last up to 50 years in stumps of dead trees, infecting new hosts that come up nearby in that time period. In areas of infection, called a root-disease center, can develop.

== Environment ==
Armillaria infects trees in temperate and tropical regions. Armillaria commonly infects stressed trees that have been weakened by insects, other pathogens and/or climate stresses. It can also kill healthy trees especially in dry areas, like coniferous forests in the western United States. This fungus is found worldwide, but prefers cool soils and climates.

== Managements ==
Plant varieties that are resistant to Armillaria or species are resistant to other environmental or biological stressors. If the infected area has been cleared of trees, plants that are not vulnerable to the disease should be planted for five or so years until Armillaria is eradicated. Stump removal is also an effective management tool but can be expensive. Another way to reduce susceptibility is to maintain plant health by regular fertilization (if needed), watering during droughts, and trying not to create wounds on the plant. Fumigation can also be used to reduce the amount of inoculum.

Cultural practices can also be effective for preventing the spread of Armillaria. High temperatures interfere with the progression of this disease; if soil temperatures reach 79 °F (26 °C), then the growth of Armillaria in the soil will be limited. Using collar excavation to expose primary roots directly below the crown to the continuous cycle of solar heating and air may reduce the colonization from Armillaria in trees that are already infected. This is called root collar excavation (RCE), and while it has been applied to citrus orchards and grapevines, this method has high labor costs and involvement due to the difficulty of carefully exposing these primary roots.

Armillaria often occurs when a host is stressed due to other abiotic or biotic factors. It is often more cost effective to treat the stressor that caused the pathogen rather than treating Armillaria on its own, as these treatments and practices are not practical for everyday use.

== Importance ==
This disease poses a serious threat to the timber industry in that it affects nearly every cultivated species of hardwood and proves very difficult to remove once it has entered an area. The ability to spread using rhizomorphs as well as through mycelial contact allow the fungus to spread over very large areas and between many individuals. In fact, Armillaria is recognized as the largest living organism due to its clonal method of spreading. Infection is especially strong where environmental conditions are optimal and a large amount of possible hosts exist. This essentially is anywhere hardwoods are found growing. It has been found in every state in the United States as well as on several other continents including Australia, Europe, and Asia.
