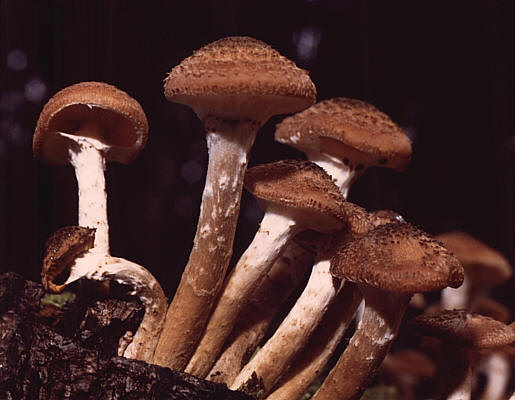

Scientific classification
- Kingdom: Fungi
- Division: Basidiomycota
- Class: Agaricomycetes
- Order: Agaricales
- Family: Physalacriaceae
- Genus: Armillaria
- Species: A. ostoyae

Binomial name
- Armillaria ostoyae (Romagnesi) Herink (1973)

Synonyms
- Agaricus congregatus Bolton 1791 nom. illeg.; Armillaria mellea var. obscura Gillet 1874; Armillariella ostoyae Romagn. 1970 nom. cons.; Armillaria solidipes Peck 1900 nom. rej.

= Armillaria ostoyae =

Species of fungus

Armillaria ostoyae
- Mycological characteristics
- Gills on hymenium
- Cap is campanulate or convex
- Hymenium is decurrent
- Stipe has a ring
- Spore print is white
- Ecology is parasitic
- Edibility is choice

Armillaria ostoyae (synonym A. solidipes) is a pathogenic species of fungus in the family Physalacriaceae. It has decurrent lamella (mushroom gills), and the mushroom stalk (stipe) has a annulus (ring). The mycelium invades the sapwood of trees, and is able to disseminate, like little entangled strings, over great distances under the bark or between trees in the form of black mycelial cord (rhizomorphs). In most areas of North America, A. ostoyae can be distinguished from other Armillaria species by its cream-brown colors, prominent cap scales, and a well-developed ring.

The species grows and spreads primarily underground, such that the bulk of the organism is not visible from the surface. In the autumn, the subterranean parts of the organism bloom "honey mushrooms" as surface fruits. Low competition for land and nutrients often allow this fungus to grow to huge proportions, and it possibly covers more total geographical area than any other single living organism. It is common on both hardwood and conifer wood in forests west of the Cascade Range in Oregon.

A spatial genetic analysis estimated that an individual specimen growing over 91 acres (37 ha) in northern Michigan weighs 440 tons (4 × 10^{5} kg). Another specimen in northeastern Oregon's Malheur National Forest is one of the largest organisms on Earth, if not the largest living organism on Earth, by mass, area, and volume; it covers 3.5 square miles (2,200 acres; 9.1 km^{2}), and weighs as much as 35,000 tons (about 31,500 tonnes)... and continues to grow.

== Taxonomy ==
The species was long known as Armillaria ostoyae Romagn., until a team of mycologists in 2008 published that the species had been previously been described under an earlier name, Armillaria solidipes, by Charles Horton Peck in 1900, long before Henri Romagnesi had described the organism in 1970. Subsequently, a proposal to conserve the name Armillaria ostoyae was published in 2011 and has been approved by the Nomenclature Committee for Fungi.

It is the most common variant of the species complex under the name A. mellea in the western United States.

== Description ==
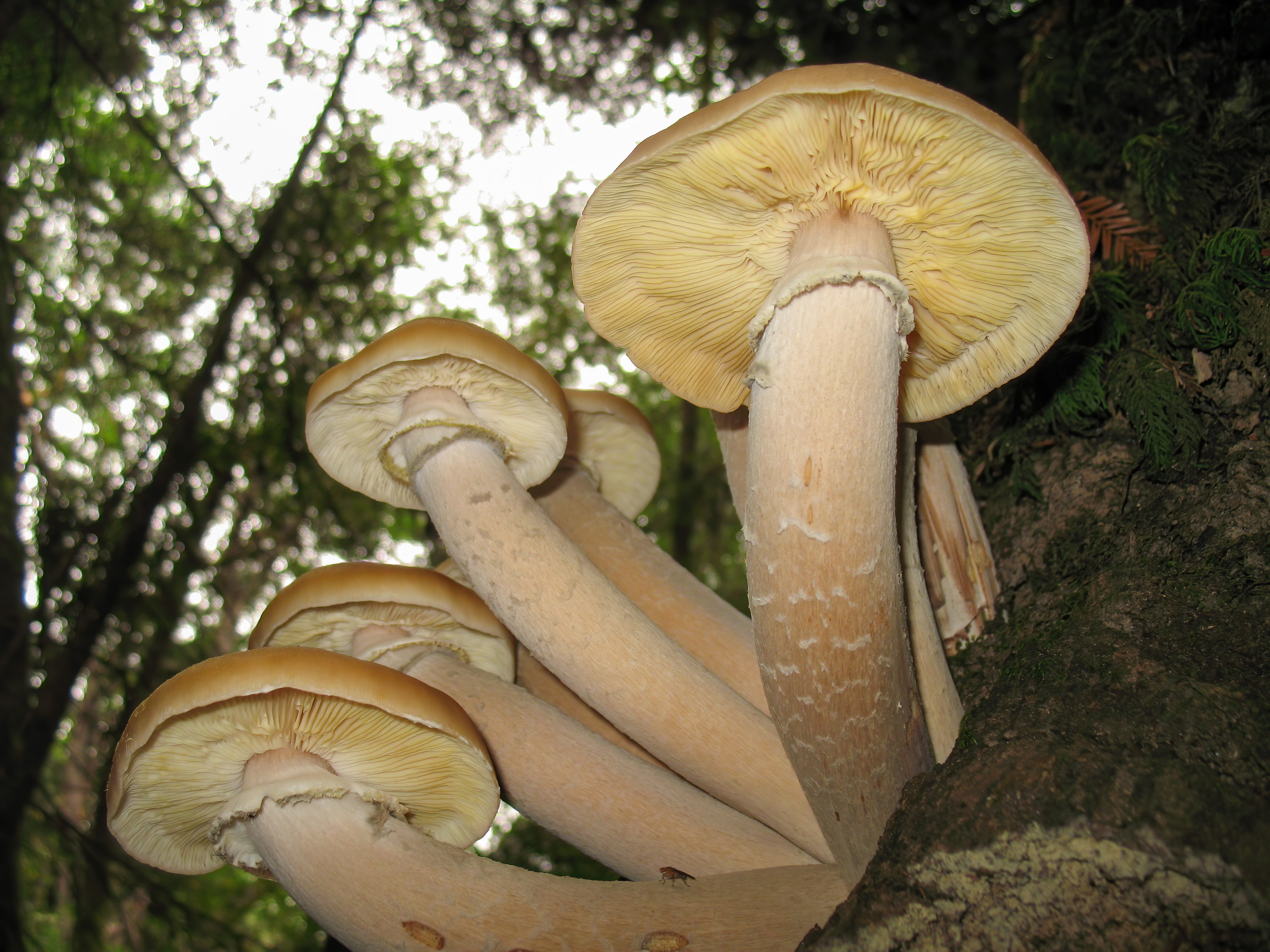
Armillaria ostoyae

This fungus, like most parasitic fungi, reproduces sexually. The fungi begin life as spores, released into the environment by a mature mushroom. There are two mating types for spores (not male and female but similar in effect). Spores can be dispersed by environmental factors such as wind, or they can be redeposited by an animal. Once the spores are in a resting state, the single spore must come in contact with a spore of a complementary mating type and of the same species. If the single spore isolates are from different species, the colonies will not fuse together and they will remain separate. When two isolates of the same species but different mating types fuse together, they soon form coalesced colonies which become dark brown and flat. With this particular fungus it will produce mycelial cords – the shoestrings – also known as rhizomorphs. These rhizomorphs allow the fungus to obtain nutrients over distances. These are also the main factors to its pathogenicity.

As the fruiting body continues to grow and obtain nutrients, it forms into a mature mushroom. Armillaria ostoyae in particular grows wide and thin gills, radiating decurrently from the stem. The gills leave a white spore print. Once spore formation is complete, the mature mushroom is able to spread its spores to start a new generation. The stem retains a well-developed ring.

Like several other Armillaria, the mycelium of A. ostoyae can display bioluminescence, resulting in foxfire.

=== Genetics and mass ===
Using genotyping and clonal analysis, scientists determined that a 2,500-year old specimen of Armillaria ostoyae in northern Michigan, United States originated from spores of a parent fungus in Ontario, Canada, then grew over millennia into the 21st century to a mass of 440 tons (4 × 10^{5} kg), making it the equivalent in weight of 3 blue whales. By comparison of acreage, the Michigan A. ostoyae covers only 38% of the estimated land area of the Oregon "humongous fungus" at 3.5 square miles (9.1 km^{2}), (2,240 acres (910 ha) which may weigh as much as 35,000 tons. It is currently the world's largest single living organism. The species possibly covers more total geographical area than any other single living organism.

=== Similar species ===
A. ostoyae may be confused with Mottled rot (Pholiota limonella). It has similar mushrooms, but only if mycelial fans are not present.

== Distribution and habitat ==
Armillaria ostoyae is mostly common in the cooler regions of the northern hemisphere. In North America, this fungus is found on host coniferous trees in the forests of British Columbia and the Pacific Northwest. It also grows in parts of Asia. While Armillaria ostoyae is distributed throughout the different biogeoclimatic zones of British Columbia, the root disease causes the greatest problem in the interior parts of the region in the Interior Cedar Hemlock biogeoclimatic zone. It is both present in the interior where it is more common as well as along the coast.

A mushroom of this type in the Malheur National Forest in the Strawberry Mountains of eastern Oregon, was found to be the largest fungal colony in the world, spanning an area of 3.5 square miles (2,200 acres; 9.1 km^{2}). This organism is estimated to be some 8,000 years old and may weigh as much as 35,000 tons. If this colony is considered a single organism, it is one of the largest known organisms in the world by area, only knowingly rivalled by a colony of Posidonia australis on the Australian seabed that measures 200 square kilometres (77 mi^{2}; 49,000 acres), and rivals the aspen grove "Pando" as the known organism with the highest living biomass. Another "humongous fungus" – a specimen of Armillaria gallica found at a site near Crystal Falls, Michigan – covers 91 acres (0.37 km^{2}; 0.142 sq mi), was found to have originated from a parent fungus in Ontario.

== Pathogenicity ==
This species of fungus is of particular interest to forest managers, as it is highly pathogenic to a number of commercial softwoods, notably Douglas-fir (Pseudotsuga menziesii), true firs (Abies spp.), pine trees (Pinus), and Western Hemlock (Tsuga heterophylla). A commonly prescribed treatment is the clear cutting of an infected stand followed by planting the area with species of trees more resistant to the fungus, which includes Western redcedar (Thuja plicata) and deciduous species.

Pathogenicity of the fungus is seen to differ among trees of varying age and location. Younger conifer trees at age 10 and below are more susceptible to infection leading to mortality, while more mature trees have an increased chance of survival; mortality can become rare in trees that have reached 20 years of age. While mortality among older conifers is less likely to occur, it does happen in forests with dryer climates.

Pathogenicity of Armillaria ostoyae appears to be more common in stands in interior regions, but its virulence is seen to be greater near the coast. Although conifers in the coastal regions show a lower rate of mortality from the root disease, the infection rates can be much worse. Despite differences between the two regions in how infections occur, infections are generally established by rhizomorph strands, and pathogenicity is correlated to rhizomorph production.

=== Diagnosis ===
A tree is diagnosed with this parasitic fungus when the following characteristics are identified:

- Resin flow from tree base
- Crown thinning or changing color to yellow or red
- Distress crop of cones
- White mycelial fan under bark
- Black rhizomorphs penetrating root surfaces
- Honey-colored mushrooms near base of tree in fall
- On the east side of the Cascades, affected trees are often in groups or patches; usually single trees on the west side.

Dead and diseased trees usually occur in disease centers, which appear as openings in the canopy. GPS tracking can aid in the monitoring of these areas. However, sometimes distinct centers will be absent and diseased trees are scattered throughout a stand.

=== Treatment ===
Armillaria can remain viable in stumps for 50 years. Chemical treatments do not eradicate the fungus entirely, and they are not cost-effective. The most frequent and effective approach to managing root disease problems is to attempt to control them at final harvest by replanting site-suited tree species that are disease tolerant. In eastern Washington that typically means replacing Douglas-fir or true fir stands with ponderosa pine, western larch, western white pine, lodgepole pine, western red cedar, alder, or spruce. Species susceptibility varies somewhat from location to location. All trees in the disease center as well as uninfected trees within 50 feet (15 m) should be cut. No tree from a highly susceptible species should be planted within 100 ft (30 m) of a disease center.

Another fungus, Hypholoma fasciculare, has been shown in early experiments to competitively exclude Armillaria ostoyae in both field and laboratory conditions; further experimentation is required to discover whether this treatment works.

Another more expensive alternative to changing species is to remove diseased stumps and trees from the site by pushing them out with a bulldozer. Exposure to air dries the fungus and kills it. Small roots left underground will decay before they can reinfect the new seedlings, so it is not necessary to burn them. After stump removal, any species may be planted. The removal of stumps (stumping) has been used to prevent contact between infected stumps and newer growth resulting in lower infection rates. It is unknown if the lower infection rates will persist as roots of young trees extend closer to the original inoculate from the preceding stand.

The most important control measure after planting is to manage for reduced tree stress. This includes regulating species composition, maintaining biological diversity, and reducing the chances for insect pest buildup. Mixed-species forests are more resistant to insect defoliation, and also slow the spread of species-specific pests such as dwarf mistletoe, which are both predisposing agents for Armillaria ostoyae.

== Uses ==
The species is considered a choice edible.

== See also ==
- List of Armillaria species
- List of bioluminescent fungi
