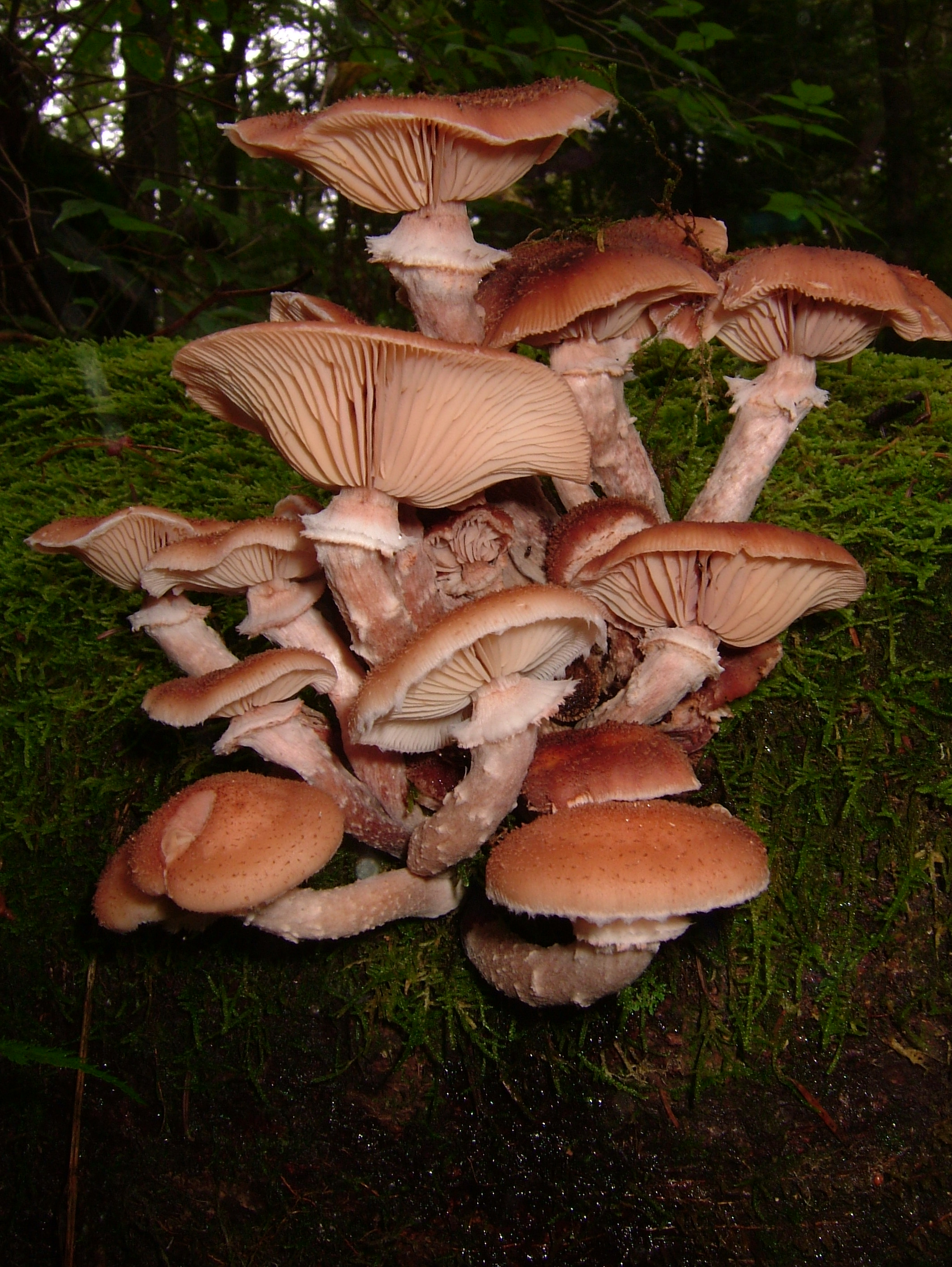

Scientific classification
- Domain: Eukaryota
- Kingdom: Fungi
- Division: Basidiomycota
- Class: Agaricomycetes
- Order: Agaricales
- Family: Physalacriaceae
- Genus: Armillaria
- Species: A. gemina

Binomial name
- Armillaria gemina Bérubé & Dessur. (1989)

= Armillaria gemina =

Species of fungus

Armillaria gemina is a species of mushroom in the family Physalacriaceae. In North America, this rare species is found from the Appalachian Mountains eastwards. The mycelium of the fungus is bioluminescent.

== See also ==
- List of Armillaria species
