= List of Pleurotus species =

Pleurotus is a genus of fungi. As of February 2023, Index Fungorum lists 203 species in the genus.

A B C D E F G H I J K L M N O P Q R S T U V U W X Y Z

== A ==
- Pleurotus abieticola R.H.Petersen & K.W.Hughes 1997
- Pleurotus abscondens (Peck) Sacc. 1887
- Pleurotus achilleae Velen. 1927
- Pleurotus agaves Dennis 1970
- Pleurotus albidus (Berk.) Pegler 1983
- Pleurotus albipes Beauseign. 1926
- Pleurotus allochrous (Pers.) Sacc. & Traverso 1911
- Pleurotus alocasiae Corner 1981
- Pleurotus alveolus Velen. 1927
- Pleurotus anas Overeem 1927
- Pleurotus anastomosans Rick 1930
- Pleurotus angustatus (Berk. & Broome) Sacc. 1887
- Pleurotus arbuticola Pilát 1935
- Pleurotus armeniacus Corner 1981
- Pleurotus arrhenioides Henn. & E. Nyman 1899
- Pleurotus aureovillosus Corner 1981
- Pleurotus australis Sacc. 1891

== B ==
- Pleurotus badius (Murrill) Murrill 1916
- Pleurotus bajocalifornicus Esteve-Rav., G. Moreno & N. Ayala 1993
- Pleurotus berberidicola (Speg.) Sacc. 1891
- Pleurotus bipindiensis Henn. 1901
- Pleurotus bourdotii (Quél.) Sacc. & Traverso 1911

== C ==
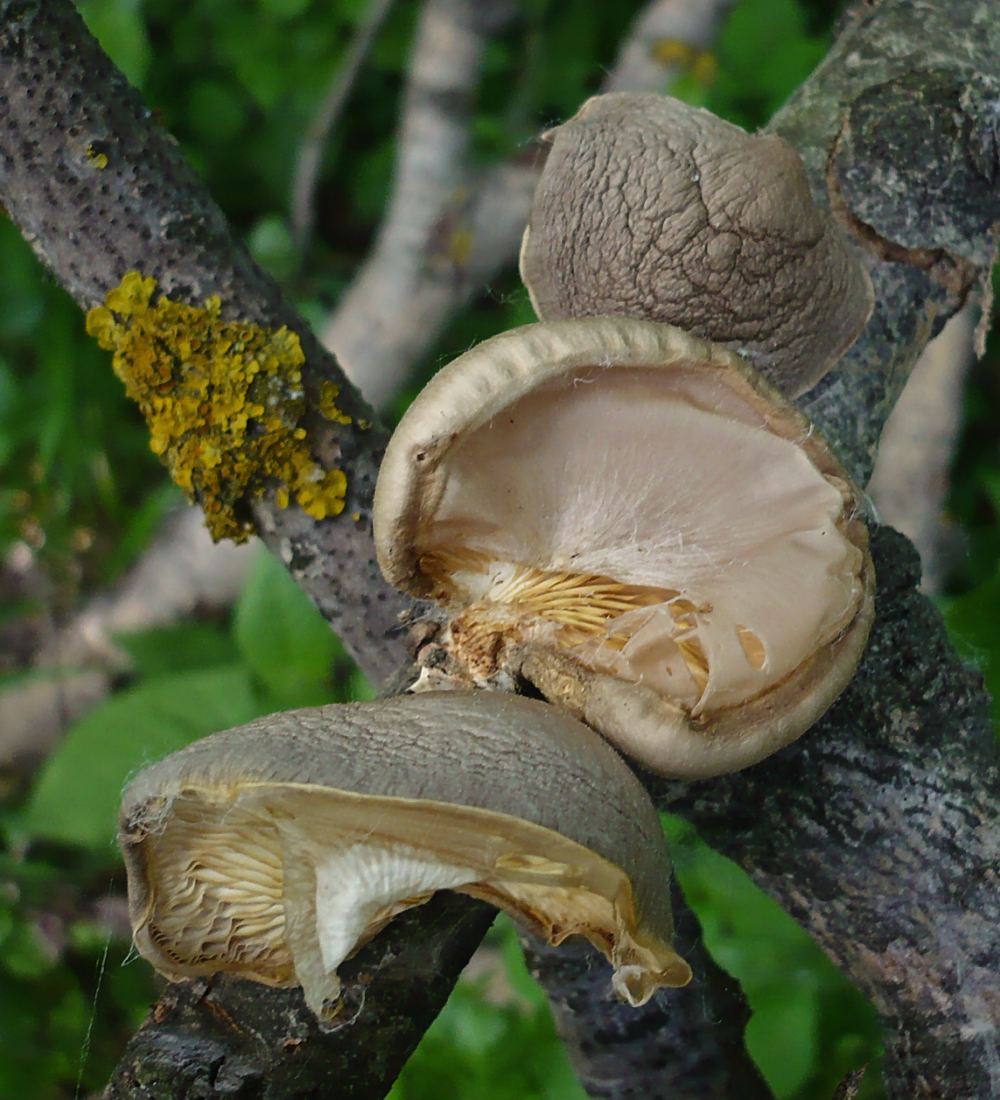
Pleurotus calyptratus

- Pleurotus caespitosoterrestris (Henn.) Pilát 1935
- Pleurotus caldwellii A.Mackay 1905
- Pleurotus calyptratus (Lindblad ex Fr.) Sacc. 1887
- Pleurotus camerunensis Henn. ex Sacc. & P. Syd. 1899
- Pleurotus chrysorrhizus Corner 1981
- Pleurotus cinerascens Velen. 1927
- Pleurotus citrinopileatus Singer 1942
- Pleurotus colae Massee 1912
- Pleurotus colensoi Berk. ex Massee 1899
- Pleurotus columbinus Quél. 1881
- Pleurotus compactus Herp. 1912
- Pleurotus concha (Hoffm.) Sacc. & Traverso 1910
- Pleurotus convivarum Dunal & Delile 1901
- Pleurotus cornucopiae (Paulet) Rolland 1910
- Pleurotus craspedius (Fr.) Gillet 1876
- Pleurotus cretaceus Massee 1899
- Pleurotus cucullatus (Bres.) Bres. 1920
- Pleurotus cyatheae S.Ito & S.Imai 1939
- Pleurotus cyatheicola Corner 1981
- Pleurotus cystidifer Velen. 1927
- Pleurotus cystidiosus O.K.Mill. 1969 (edible)

== D ==
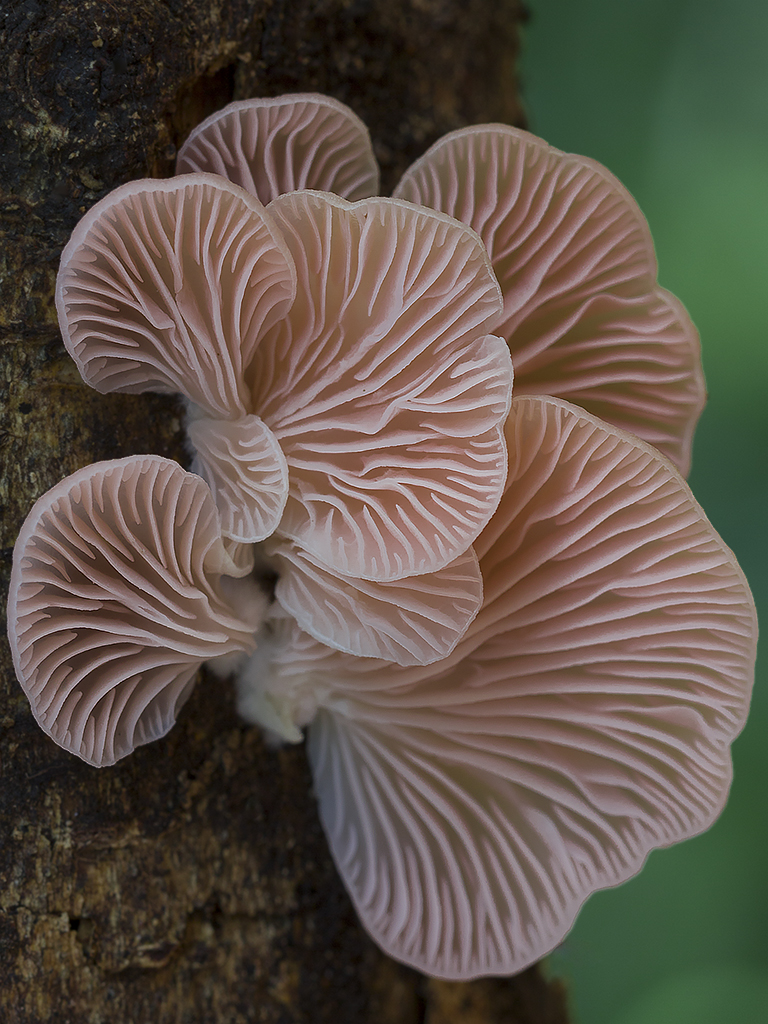
Pleurotus djamor

- Pleurotus decipiens Corner 1981
- Pleurotus diabasicus Velen. 1920
- Pleurotus diffractus Pilát 1941
- Pleurotus djamor (Rumph. ex Fr.) Boedijn 1959
- Pleurotus dracaenae Torrend 1909
- Pleurotus dryinus (Pers.) P.Kumm. 1871

== E ==
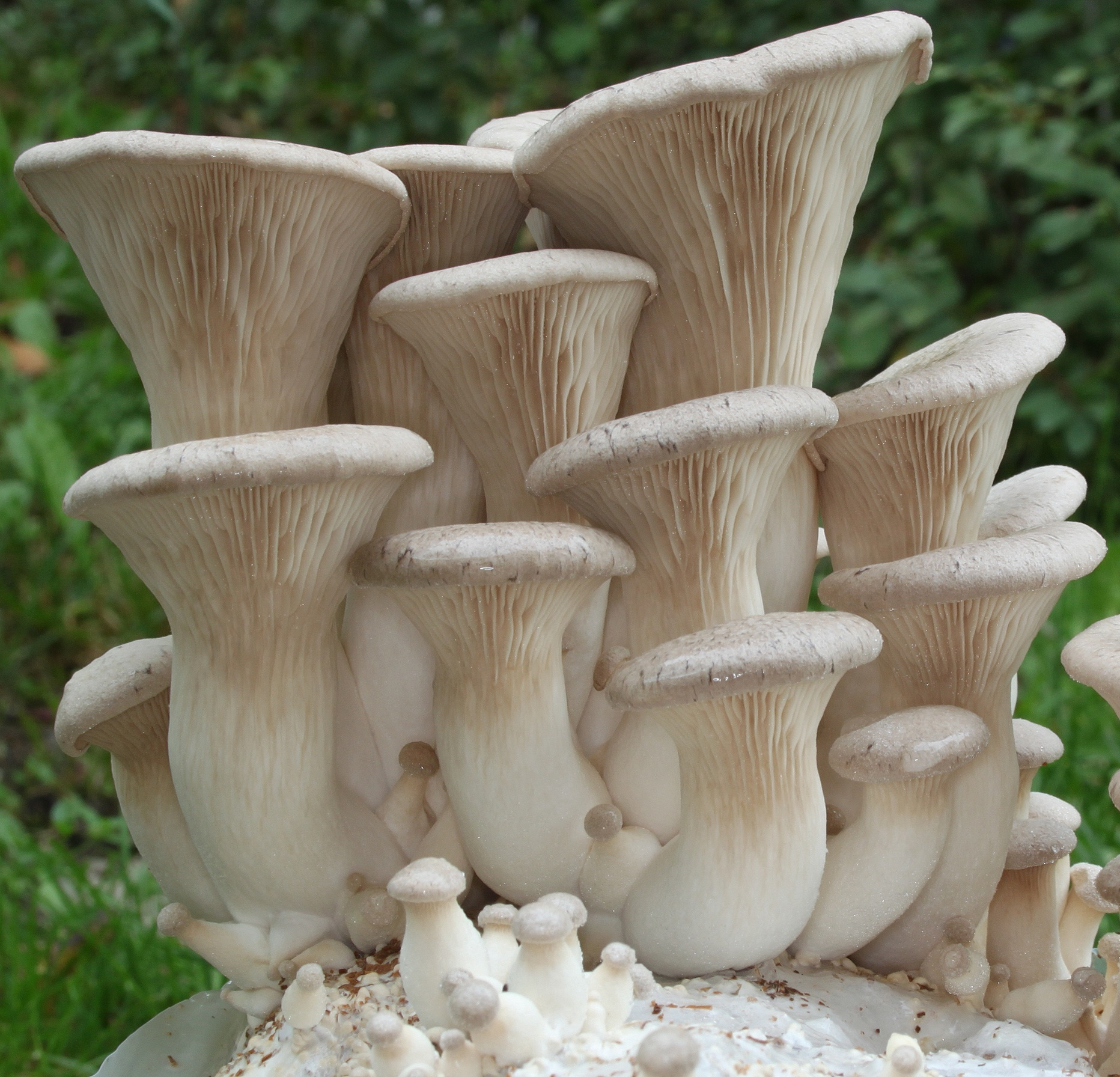
Pleurotus eryngii

- Pleurotus elegantissimus Speg. 1922
- Pleurotus eleuterophyllus (Lév.) Sacc. & Trotter 1912
- Pleurotus eous (Berk.) Sacc. 1887
- Pleurotus epilobii Velen. 1930
- Pleurotus eremita Maire 1931
- Pleurotus eryngii (DC.) Quél. 1872
- Pleurotus eugeniae (Earle) Sacc. & Traverso 1911
- Pleurotus euosmus (Berk.) Sacc. 1887
- Pleurotus excavatus Sacc. 1887

== F ==
- Pleurotus fagineus Velen. 1927
- Pleurotus favoloides Singer 1989
- Pleurotus ferulaginis Zervakis, Venturella & Cattarossi 2014
- Pleurotus flabellatus Sacc. 1887
- Pleurotus flexilis S.T. Chang & X.L. Mao 1995
- Pleurotus floridanus Singer 1948
- Pleurotus fuligineocinereus (Britzelm.) Sacc. & Trotter 1912
- Pleurotus fuscosquamulosus D.A.Reid & Eicker 1998
- Pleurotus fuscus var. ferulae (Lanzi) Sacc. 1887

== G ==
- Pleurotus geesterani Singer 1962
- Pleurotus gelatinosus Petch 1924
- Pleurotus giganteus (Berk.) Karun. & K.D.Hyde 2011
- Pleurotus guaraniticus (Berk.) Karun. & K.D.Hyde 2011
- Pleurotus gussonei (Scalia) Bres. 1920
- Pleurotus gypseus Velen. 1920

== H ==
- Pleurotus herbarum Velen. 1927
- Pleurotus heteropus (Speg.) Speg. 1887
- Pleurotus hollandianus Sumst. 1906
- Pleurotus hortensis Velen. 1926
- Pleurotus hyacinthus Corner 1981
- Pleurotus hygrophanus (Earle) Sacc. & Traverso 1911

== I ==
- Pleurotus ilgazicus Pilát 1932
- Pleurotus imbricatus (Earle) Sacc. & Traverso 1911
- Pleurotus immersus Velen. 1939
- Pleurotus importatus Henn. 1897
- Pleurotus incarnatus Hongo 1973
- Pleurotus inconspicuus Massee 1892
- Pleurotus inornatus Speg. 1919
- Pleurotus insidiosus (Sacc.) Y.S.Chang & Kantvilas 1993

== J ==
- Pleurotus juniperi Velen. 1927

== K ==
- Pleurotus kabulensis (Singer) Batyrova 1985
- Pleurotus kotlabae Pilát 1953
- Pleurotus kudrnae Velen. 1927

== L ==
- Pleurotus lagotis (Berk. & M.A. Curtis) Sacc. 1887
- Pleurotus lampas (Berk.) Sacc. 1887
- Pleurotus lampyrinus Pat. 1915
- Pleurotus langei Pilát 1935
- Pleurotus laricinus Velen. 1947
- Pleurotus lazoi Donoso 1981
- Pleurotus lichenicola Speg. 1889
- Pleurotus lilaceilentus Corner 1981
- Pleurotus lindquistii Singer 1960
- Pleurotus lobatus Henn. & E.Nyman 1899
- Pleurotus luctuosus Corner 1981
- Pleurotus luminosus Beeli 1922
- Pleurotus luteoalbus Beeli 1928
- Pleurotus luteosaturatus (Malençon) P.-A.Moreau 2009

== M ==
- Pleurotus macilentus Massee 1901
- Pleurotus magnificus Rick 1906
- Pleurotus malleeanus Cleland 1933
- Pleurotus membranaceus Massee 1901
- Pleurotus mexicanus Guzmán 1974
- Pleurotus meyeri-herrmannii Henn. 1900
- Pleurotus michailowskojensis (Henn.) Pilát 1935
- Pleurotus microleucus Singer 1978
- Pleurotus microspermus Speg. 1889
- Pleurotus minor Sosin 1960
- Pleurotus minutoniger Lloyd 1925
- Pleurotus musae Corner 1981
- Pleurotus mutabilis Killerm. 1933

== N ==
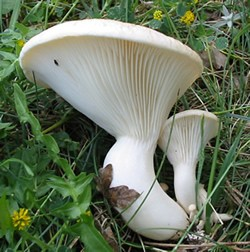
Pleurotus nebrodensis

- Pleurotus neapolitanus (Pers.) Singer 1943
- Pleurotus nebrodensis (Inzenga) Quél. 1886
- Pleurotus nemecii Pilát 1932
- Pleurotus nepalensis Corner 1955
- Pleurotus nitidus Har. Takah. & Taneyama 2016
- Pleurotus novae-zelandiae (Berk.) Sacc. 1887

== O ==
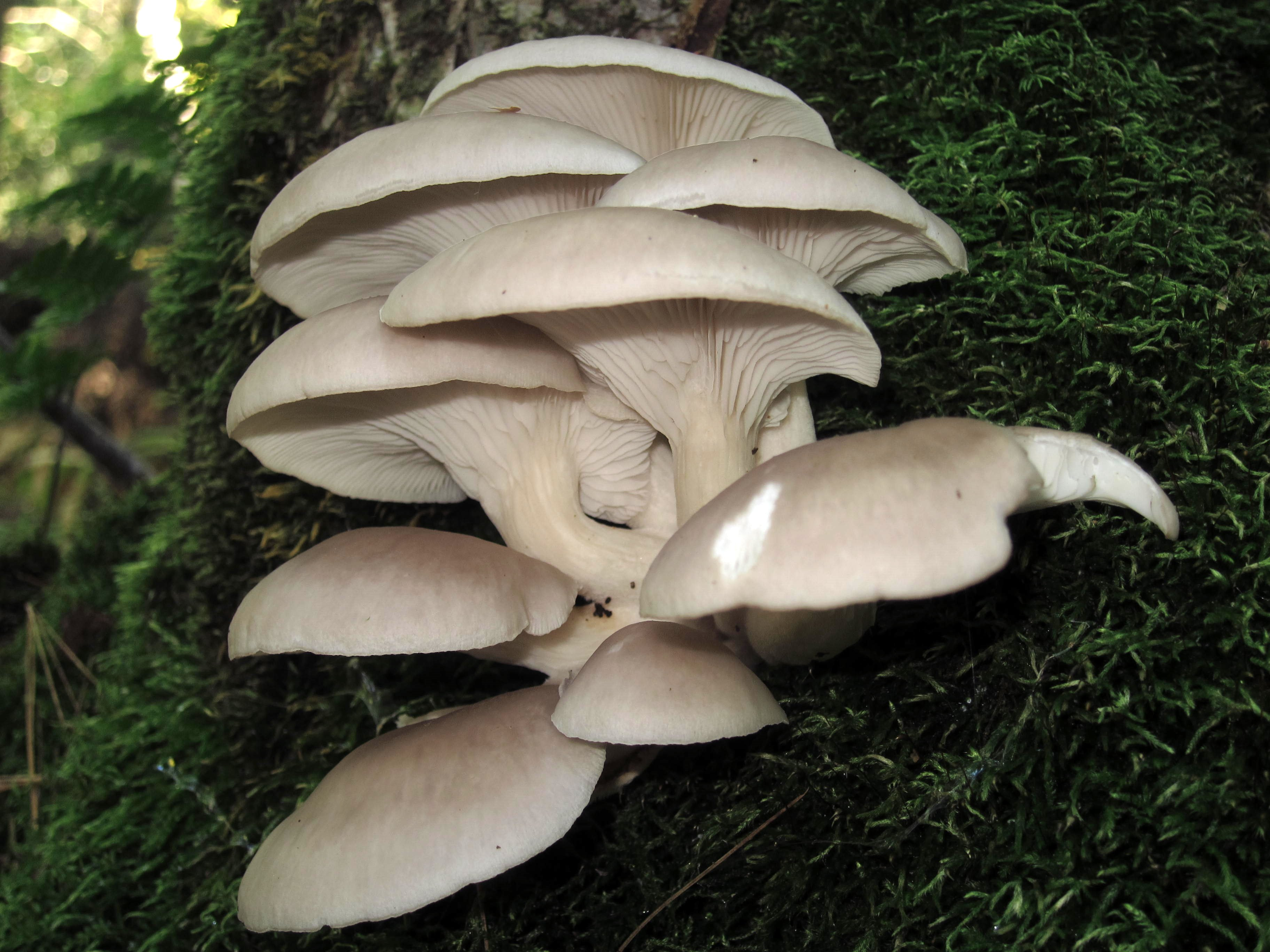
Pleurotus ostreatus

- Pleurotus olivascens Corner 1981
- Pleurotus omnivagus Corner 1981
- Pleurotus opuntiae (Durieu & Lév.) Sacc. 1887
- Pleurotus oregonensis(Murrill) Murrill 1912
- Pleurotus orizabensis (Murrill) Sacc. & Trotter 1925
- Pleurotus ostreatoroseus Singer 1961
- Pleurotus ostreatus (Jacq.) P.Kumm. 1871

== P ==
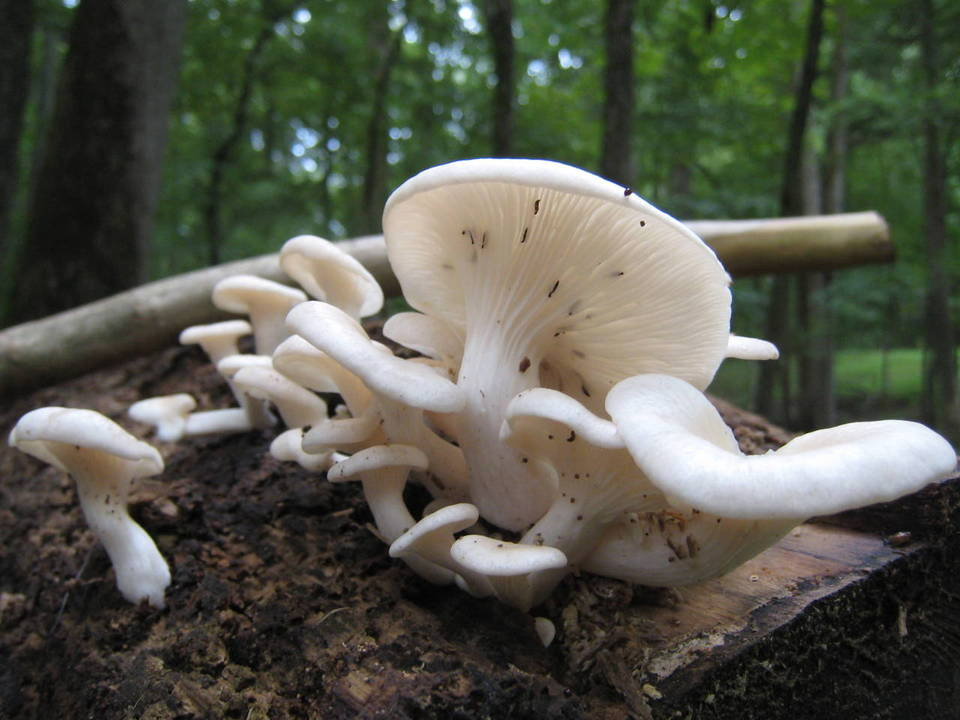
Pleurotus pulmonarius

- Pleurotus palmicola Beeli 1938
- Pleurotus parsonsiae G.Stev. 1964
- Pleurotus penangensis Corner 1981
- Pleurotus pinsitiformis Pilát 1935
- Pleurotus platypus Sacc. 1891
- Pleurotus polyphemus (Cooke & Massee) Sacc. 1891
- Pleurotus pometi (Fr.) Quél. 1872
- Pleurotus pop-ivanensis Pilát 1935
- Pleurotus populinus O.Hilber & O.K.Mill. 1993
- Pleurotus populneus Velen. 1931
- Pleurotus problematicus Corner 1981
- Pleurotus proselyta E.H.L.Krause 1928
- Pleurotus pseudosepticus Hruby 1930
- Pleurotus pseudotremens Pilát 1935
- Pleurotus pubescens Peck 1891
- Pleurotus pulchellus S.Imai 1939
- Pleurotus pulmonarius (Fr.) Quél. 1872
- Pleurotus purpureo-olivaceus (G.Stev.) Segedin, P.K.Buchanan & J.P.Wilkie 1995
- Pleurotus pusillus Speg. 1909
- Pleurotus puttemansii Henn. 1908

== R ==
- Pleurotus radicosus Pat. 1917
- Pleurotus ramosii Bres. 1926
- Pleurotus resinaceus Bres. 1920
- Pleurotus rickii Bres. 1920
- Pleurotus romellianus Pilát 1935
- Pleurotus rosarum Velen. 1927
- Pleurotus rubi Velen. 1939

== S ==
- Pleurotus sambucinus Velen. 1920
- Pleurotus samoensis Henn. 1896
- Pleurotus sarasinii Henn. 1899
- Pleurotus schwabeanus Henn. 1897
- Pleurotus serotinoides (Peck) Sacc. 1887
- Pleurotus similis Peck 1901
- Pleurotus smithii Guzmán 1975
- Pleurotus soyauxii Henn. 1891
- Pleurotus spadiceus P.Karst. 1904
- Pleurotus squamuliformis Velen. 1939
- Pleurotus staringii Oudem. 1881
- Pleurotus stella Pat. 1915
- Pleurotus suballiaceus (Murrill) Murrill 1943
- Pleurotus subareolatus Peck 1887
- Pleurotus subbarbatulus (Murrill) Sacc. & Trotter 1925
- Pleurotus subglaber (Lloyd) Singer 1951
- Pleurotus subhaedinus (Murrill) Murrill 1916
- Pleurotus submembranaceus (Berk.) Pegler 1988
- Pleurotus submitis Speg. 1889
- Pleurotus submutilus Speg. 1889
- Pleurotus subostreatus Cleland & Cheel 1919
- Pleurotus subsapidus Murrill 1912
- Pleurotus subsepticus Henn. 1908
- Pleurotus subulatus Henn. & E.Nyman 1900
- Pleurotus subviolaceus Corner 1981
- Pleurotus sulciceps (Cooke & Massee) Sacc. 1891
- Pleurotus sutherlandii Singer 1952

== T ==
- Pleurotus tahitensis Pat. 1906
- Pleurotus terrestris Peck 1907
- Pleurotus thuidii Velen. 1927
- Pleurotus tjibodensis Henn. 1900
- Pleurotus togoensis Henn. 1897
- Pleurotus tomentosulus (Peck) Sacc. 1891
- Pleurotus tremelliformis (Murrill) Murrill 1916
- Pleurotus tuber-regium (Fr.) Singer 1951
- Pleurotus tuoliensis (C.J. Mou) M.R. Zhao & Jin X. Zhang 2016

== U ==
- Pleurotus umbonatus Peck 1905

== V ==
- Pleurotus velatus Segedin, P.K.Buchanan & J.P.Wilkie 1995
- Pleurotus venosus Killerm. 1933
- Pleurotus viaticus Velen. 1920
- Pleurotus violaceocinerascens Henn. 1901
- Pleurotus viscidulus (Berk. & Broome) Cleland 1934
- Pleurotus viscidus Harmaja 1978
- Pleurotus viticola (Murrill) Murrill 1940

== Y ==
- Pleurotus yuccae Maire 1919

== Z ==
- Pleurotus zimmermannii (Eichelb.) Sacc. & Trotter 1912
