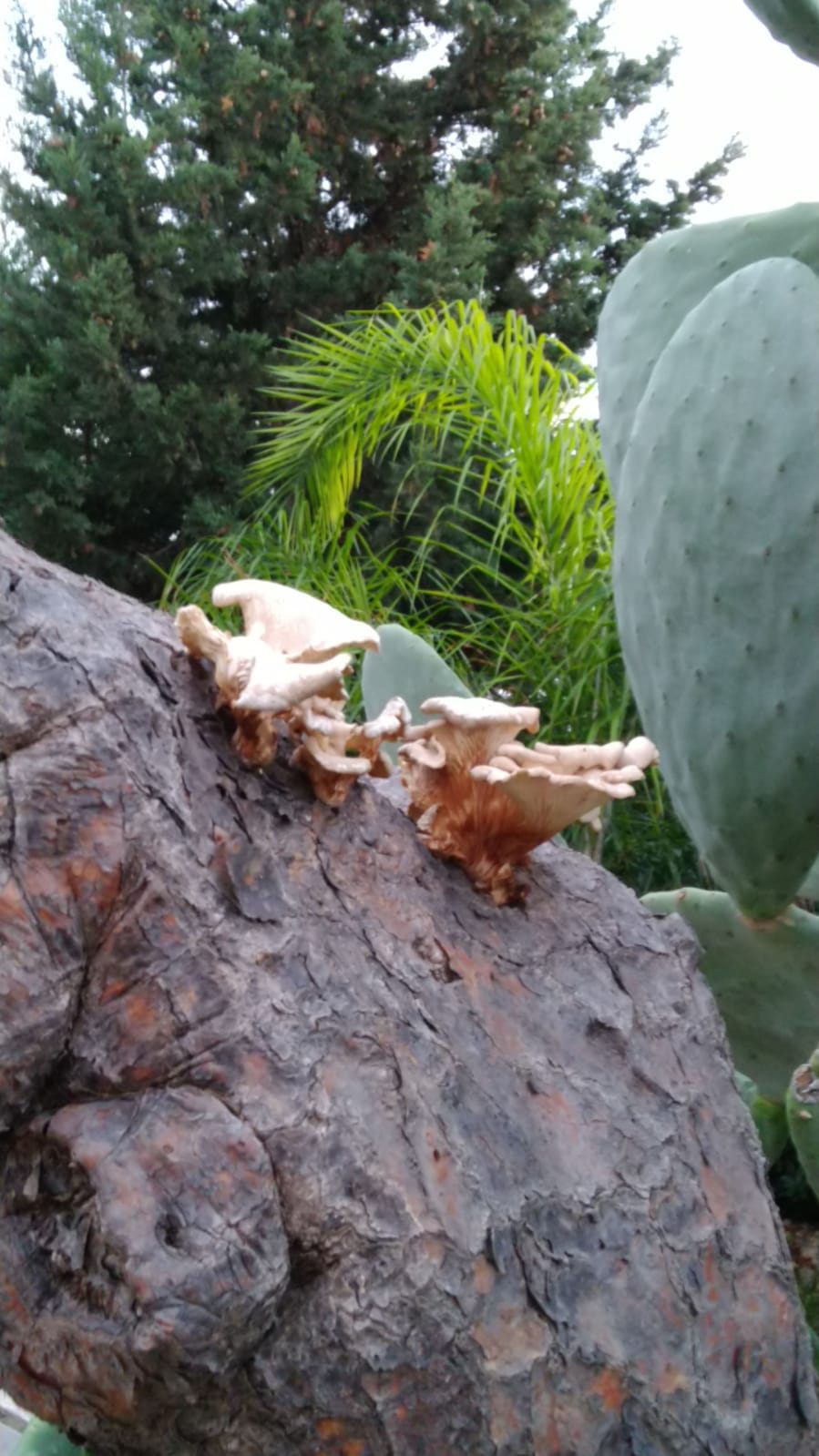
- P. opuntiae mushrooms growing on dead remains of Opuntia

Scientific classification
- Domain: Eukaryota
- Kingdom: Fungi
- Division: Basidiomycota
- Class: Agaricomycetes
- Order: Agaricales
- Family: Pleurotaceae
- Genus: Pleurotus
- Species: P. opuntiae

Binomial name
- Pleurotus opuntiae (Durieu y Lév.) Sacc. (1887)

Synonyms
- Pleurotus yuccae

= Pleurotus opuntiae =

Pleurotus opuntiae Mycological characteristics
- Gills on hymenium
- Cap is offset
- Hymenium is decurrent
- Stipe has a ring
- Spore print is white
- Ecology is saprotrophic or parasitic
- Edibility is edible

Pleurotus opuntiae is a species of Agaricales fungus that grows in the semi-arid climate of central Mexico and in New Zealand, whose mushroom is edible and considered a delicacy in the cuisine of indigenous peoples of Mexico. It is known as hongo de maguey común in Mexican Spanish, seta de chumbera/nopal in Peninsular Spanish, and kjoo'wada in Otomi language. Phylogenetic research has shown that while it belongs to the Pleurotus djamor-cornucopiae clade, it forms its own intersterility group, but it has also been claimed to be genetically inter-incompatible with Pleurotus australis, Pleurotus ostreatus (extra-limital), Pleurotus pulmonarius and Pleurotus purpureo-olivaceus of New Zealand.

== Description ==
Pleurotus opuntiae fruits gregariously in groups of several specimens on dead remains of the plant Opuntia megacantha, from which the binomial name of the fungus derives. The mushrooms are beige or cream in color. Their gills are very decurrent and their caps, from 1 to 6 centimetres (1/2 to 2 1/4 in) in diameter, are quite flat and funnel-shaped, slightly rolled at the edges. They have either a very short stipe, or often basically nonexistent one.
