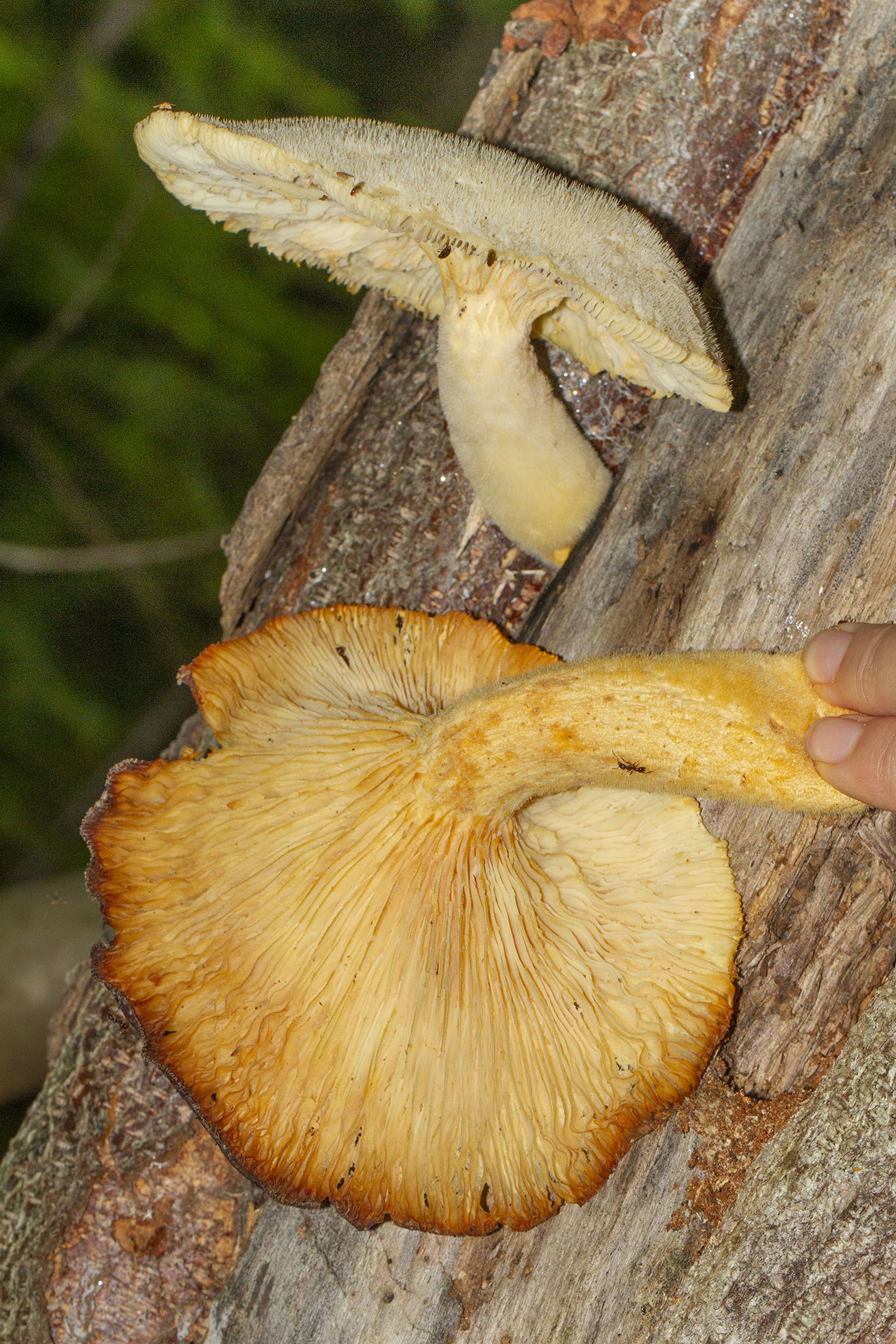

Scientific classification
- Kingdom: Fungi
- Division: Basidiomycota
- Class: Agaricomycetes
- Order: Polyporales
- Family: Polyporaceae
- Genus: Lentinus
- Species: L. levis

Binomial name
- Lentinus levis (Berk. & M.A. Curtis) Murrill 1915

Synonyms
- Pleurotus levis (Berk. & M.A. Curtis) Singer 1951; Pocillaria levis (Berk. & M.A. Curtis) Kuntze 1898; Pocillaria sullivantii (Mont.) Kuntze 1891; Panus strigosus Berk. & M.A. Curtis 1859; Lentinus sullivantii Mont. 1856; Panus levis Berk. & M.A. Curtis 1853

= Lentinus levis =

Species of fungus

Lentinus levis is a species of fungus in the family Polyporaceae. It can be found in subtropical to tropical climates in North America and is edible.

== Taxonomy ==
It was described by Miles Joseph Berkeley and Moses Ashley Curtis in 1853 and given its current name in 1915 by William Murrill.

For a long time thought to be a member of Pleurotus genus, it has been moved to genus Lentinus.

== Description ==
The whitish cap of the agaric is 6–16 centimetres (2 1/4–6 1/4 in) wide, with decurrent gills and a fairly central stem up to 12 cm (4 3/4 in) long and 2.5 cm (1 in) thick. It has a mild to sweet smell and the spore print is white.

=== Similar species ===
Pleurotus dryinus has similar fruiting bodies with a smoother cap and a more persistent partial veil. Pleurotus pulmonarius has a similar floral odor.

== Distribution and habitat ==
In nature the species grows in subtropical to tropical climates on dead hardwood. In North America, it can be found in the Mountain states and further east from June to October.

== Uses ==
The mushroom is edible.

As a saprotroph, it can be cultivated. It is recognized and sometimes collected as a food by Huichol people of Mexico, although they prefer eating other, less chewy mushrooms.
