= Pleurotus sajor-caju =

Pleurotus sajor-caju may refer to:

- Some warm weather varieties of Pleurotus pulmonarius, a commonly cultivated species of oyster mushroom, often incorrectly called Pleurotus sajor-caju
- Lentinus sajor-caju, a species of mushroom formerly called Pleurotus sajor-caju
