= Pleurotus geesterani =

Scientific classification
- Kingdom: Fungi
- Division: Basidiomycota
- Class: Agaricomycetes
- Order: Agaricales
- Family: Pleurotaceae
- Genus: Pleurotus
- Species: P. geesterani

Binomial name
- Pleurotus geesterani Singer, 1962

Species of fungus

Pleurotus geesterani, also known as pocket-sized oyster, is an edible species of fungus in the family Pleurotaceae, described as new to science by mycologist Rolf Singer in 1962. It can be cultivated, and it has gained popularity in China (under the name 秀珍菇, xiùzhēn gū) for its umami taste.

== See also ==
- List of Pleurotus species
