= Mating in fungi =

Combination of genetic material between compatible mating types

Fungi are a diverse group of organisms that employ a huge variety of reproductive strategies, ranging from fully asexual to almost exclusively sexual species. Most species can reproduce both sexually and asexually, alternating between haploid and diploid forms. This contrasts with most multicellular eukaryotes, such as mammals, where the adults are usually diploid and produce haploid gametes which combine to form the next generation. In fungi, both haploid and diploid forms can reproduce – haploid individuals can undergo asexual reproduction while diploid forms can produce gametes that combine to give rise to the next generation.

Mating in fungi is a complex process governed by mating types. Research on fungal mating has focused on several model species with different behaviour. Not all fungi reproduce sexually and many that do are isogamous; thus, for many members of the fungal kingdom, the terms "male" and "female" do not apply. Homothallic species are able to mate with themselves, while in heterothallic species only isolates of opposite mating types can mate.

Mating between isogamous fungi may consist only of a transfer of a nucleus from one cell to another. Vegetative incompatibility within species often prevents a fungal isolate from mating with another isolate. Isolates of the same incompatibility group do not mate or mating does not lead to successful offspring. High variation has been reported including same-chemotype mating, sporophyte to gametophyte mating and biparental transfer of mitochondria.

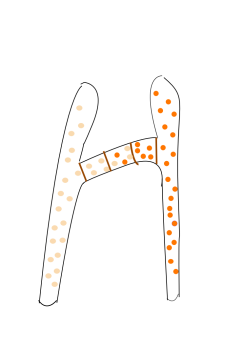
Fungi within Zygomycota form progametangia with suspensors during mating

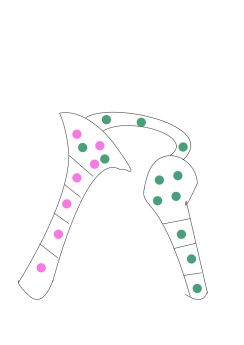
Fungi within Ascomycota form ascogonium and antheridium with trichogyne bridge

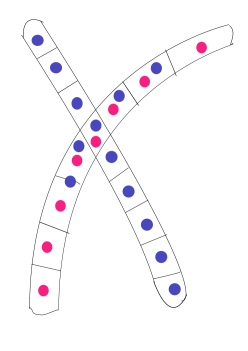
Typical mating fusion of two compatible monokaryons in Basidiomycota

== Mating in Zygomycota ==
A zygomycete hypha grows towards a compatible mate and they both form a bridge, called a progametangia, by joining at the hyphal tips via plasmogamy. A pair of septa forms around the merged tips, enclosing nuclei from both isolates. A second pair of septa forms two adjacent cells, one on each side. These adjacent cells, called suspensors provide structural support. The central cell, called the zygosporangium, is destined to become a spore. The zygosporangium is a unique structure to the Zygomycota and is easily recognizable in microscopy due to its characteristic dark color and spiky shape. The nuclei join in a process called karyogamy to form a zygote, which grows into a mature diploid zygomycete. A diploid zygomycete can then undergo meiosis to create spores, which disperse and germinate. The following generations of mycelium can undergo asexual or sexual reproduction.

The phylum Zygomycota has since been split into two phyla believed to be monophyletic, Mucoromycota and Zoopagomycota (later raised to the subkingdom rank as Mucoromyceta and Zoopagomyceta). Nevertheless, the two subkingdoms still conform to the behavior described above: "sexual reproduction, if present, via zygospores by gametangial conjugation".

== Mating in Ascomycota ==
As it approaches a mate, a haploid sac fungus develops one of two complementary organs, a "female" ascogonium or a "male" antheridium. These organs resemble gametangia except that they contain only nuclei. A bridge, the trichogyne forms, that provides a passage for nuclei to travel from the antheridium to the ascogonium. A dikaryon grows from the ascogonium, and karyogamy occurs in the fruiting body.

=== Neurospora crassa ===
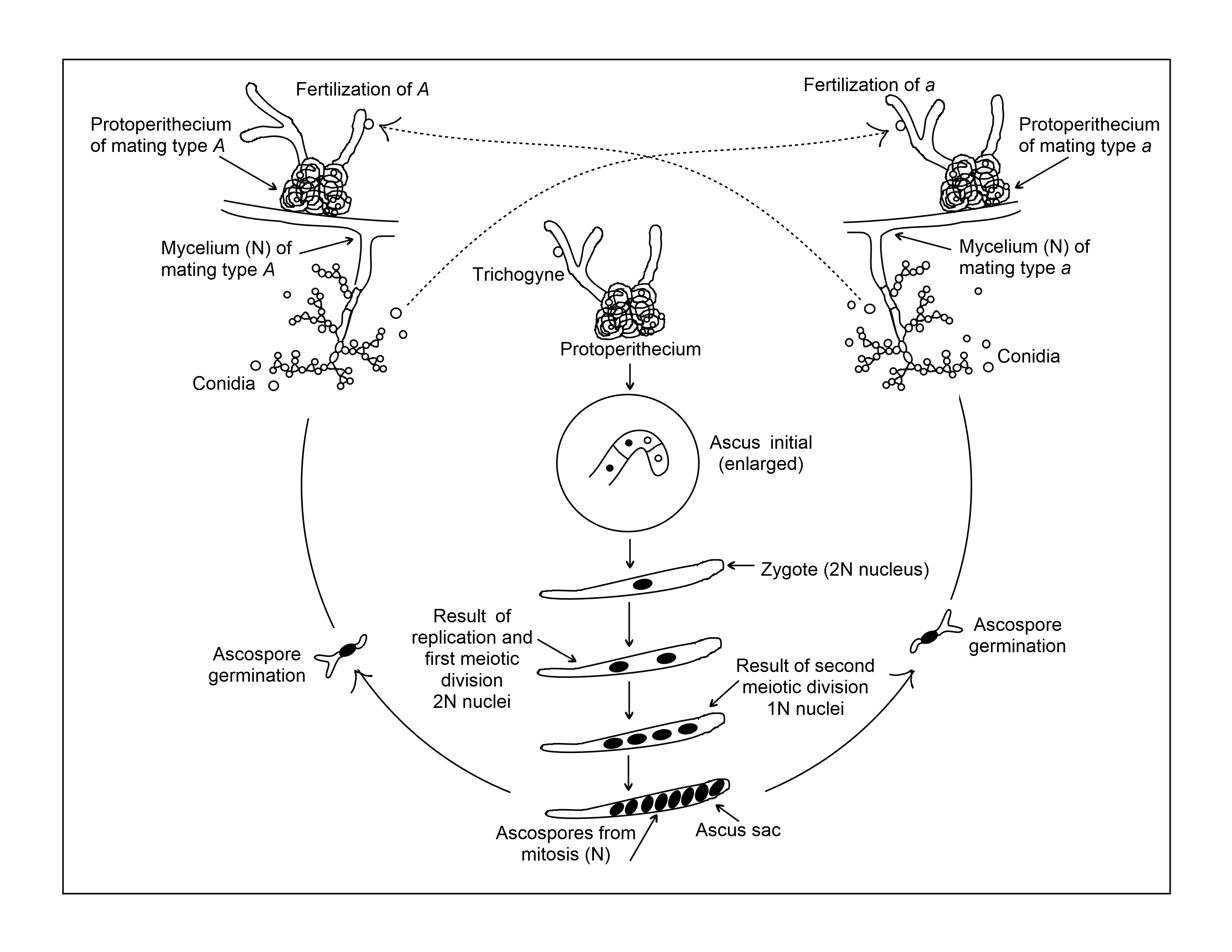
Neurospora crassa life cycle. The haploid mycelium reproduces asexually by two processes: (1) simple proliferation of existing mycelium, and (2) formation of conidia (macro- and micro-) which can be dispersed and then germinate to produce new mycelium. In the sexual cycle, mating can only occur between individual strains of different mating type, A and a. Fertilization occurs by the passage of nuclei of conidia or mycelium of one mating type into the protoperithecia of the opposite mating type through the trichogyne. Fusion of the nuclei of opposite mating types occurs within the protoperithecium to form a zygote (2N) nucleus.

Neurospora crassa is a type of red bread mold of the phylum Ascomycota. N. crassa is used as a model organism because it is easy to grow and has a haploid life cycle: this makes genetic analysis simple, since recessive traits will show up in the offspring. Analysis of genetic recombination is facilitated by the ordered arrangement of the products of meiosis within a sac-like structure called an ascus (pl. asci). In its natural environment, N. crassa lives mainly in tropical and sub-tropical regions. It often can be found growing on dead plant matter after fires.

Neurospora was used by Edward Tatum and George Wells Beadle in the experiments for which they won the Nobel Prize in Physiology or Medicine in 1958. The results of these experiments led directly to the "one gene, one enzyme" hypothesis that specific genes code for specific proteins. This concept launched molecular biology. Sexual fruiting bodies (perithecia) can only be formed when two cells of different mating type come together (see Figure). Like other Ascomycetes, N. crassa has two mating types that, in this case, are symbolized by A and a. There is no evident morphological difference between the A and a mating type strains. Both can form abundant protoperithecia, the female reproductive structure (see Figure). Protoperithecia are formed most readily in the laboratory when growth occurs on solid (agar) synthetic medium with a relatively low source of nitrogen. Nitrogen starvation appears to be necessary for expression of genes involved in sexual development. The protoperithecium consists of an ascogonium, a coiled multicellular hypha that is enclosed in a knot-like aggregation of hyphae. A branched system of slender hyphae, called the trichogyne, extends from the tip of the ascogonium projecting beyond the sheathing hyphae into the air. The sexual cycle is initiated (i.e. fertilization occurs) when a cell, usually a conidium, of opposite mating type contacts a part of the trichogyne (see Figure). Such contact can be followed by cell fusion leading to one or more nuclei from the fertilizing cell migrating down the trichogyne into the ascogonium. Since both A and a strains have the same sexual structures, neither strain can be regarded as exclusively male or female. However, as a recipient, the protoperithecium of both the A and a strains can be thought of as the female structure, and the fertilizing conidium can be thought of as the male participant.

The subsequent steps following fusion of A and a haploid cells have been outlined by Fincham and Day. and Wagner and Mitchell. After fusion of the cells, the further fusion of their nuclei is delayed. Instead, a nucleus from the fertilizing cell and a nucleus from the ascogonium become associated and begin to divide synchronously. The products of these nuclear divisions (still in pairs of unlike mating type, i.e. A/a) migrate into numerous ascogenous hyphae, which then begin to grow out of the ascogonium. Each of these ascogenous hyphae bends to form a hook (or crozier) at its tip and the A and a pair of haploid nuclei within the crozier divide synchronously. Next, septa form to divide the crozier into three cells. The central cell in the curve of the hook contains one A and one a nucleus (see Figure). This binuclear cell initiates ascus formation and is called an "ascus-initial" cell. Next the two uninucleate cells on either side of the first ascus-forming cell fuse with each other to form a binucleate cell that can grow to form a further crozier that can then form its own ascus-initial cell. This process can then be repeated multiple times.

After formation of the ascus-initial cell, the A and a nuclei fuse with each other to form a diploid nucleus (see Figure). This nucleus is the only diploid nucleus in the entire life cycle of N. crassa. The diploid nucleus has 14 chromosomes formed from the two fused haploid nuclei that had 7 chromosomes each. Formation of the diploid nucleus is immediately followed by meiosis. The two sequential divisions of meiosis lead to four haploid nuclei, two of the A mating type and two of the a mating type. One further mitotic division leads to four A and four a nucleus in each ascus. Meiosis is an essential part of the life cycle of all sexually reproducing organisms, and in its main features, meiosis in N. crassa seems typical of meiosis generally.

As the above events are occurring, the mycelial sheath that had enveloped the ascogonium develops as the wall of the perithecium becomes impregnated with melanin, and blackens. The mature perithecium has a flask-shaped structure.

A mature perithecium may contain as many as 300 asci, each derived from identical fusion diploid nuclei. Ordinarily, in nature, when the perithecia mature the ascospores are ejected rather violently into the air. These ascospores are heat resistant and, in the lab, require heating at 60 °C for 30 minutes to induce germination. For normal strains, the entire sexual cycle takes 10 to 15 days. In a mature ascus containing eight ascospores, pairs of adjacent spores are identical in genetic constitution, since the last division is mitotic, and since the ascospores are contained in the ascus sac that holds them in a definite order determined by the direction of nuclear segregations during meiosis. Since the four primary products are also arranged in sequence, a first division segregation pattern of genetic markers can be distinguished from a second division segregation pattern.

=== Benefit of mating type in N. crassa ===
That mating in N. crassa can only occur between strains of different mating type suggests that some degree of outcrossing is favored by natural selection. In haploid multicellular fungi, such as N. crassa, meiosis occurring in the brief diploid stage is one of their most complex processes. The haploid multicellular vegetative stage, although physically much larger than the diploid stage, characteristically has a simple modular construction with little differentiation. In N. crassa, recessive mutations affecting the diploid stage of the life cycle are quite frequent in natural populations. These mutations, when homozygous in the diploid stage, often cause spores to have maturation defects or to produce barren fruiting bodies with few ascospores (sexual spores). The majority of these homozygous mutations cause abnormal meiosis (e.g. disturbed chromosome pairing or disturbed pachytene or diplotene). The number of genes affecting the diploid stage was estimated to be at least 435 (about 4% of the total number of 9,730 genes). Thus, outcrossing, promoted by the necessity for union of opposite mating types, likely provides the benefit of masking recessive mutations that would otherwise be deleterious to sexual spore formation (see Complementation (genetics)).

=== Saccharomyces cerevisiae ===
The yeast cell's life cycle: 1. Budding; 2. Conjugation; 3. Spore

Saccharomyces cerevisiae, brewer's and baker's yeast, is in the phylum Ascomycota. During vegetative growth that ordinarily occurs when nutrients are abundant, S. cerevisiae reproduces by mitosis as either haploid or diploid cells. However, when starved, diploid cells undergo meiosis to form haploid spores. Mating occurs when haploid cells of opposite mating type, MATa and MATα, come into contact. Ruderfer et al. pointed out that such contacts are frequent between closely related yeast cells for two reasons. The first is that cells of opposite mating type are present together in the same ascus, the sac that contains the tetrad of cells directly produced by a single meiosis, and these cells can mate with each other. The second reason is that haploid cells of one mating type, upon cell division, often produce cells of the opposite mating type with which they may mate.

Katz Ezov et al. presented evidence that in natural S. cerevisiae populations clonal reproduction and a type of "self-fertilization" (in the form of intratetrad mating) predominate. Ruderfer et al. analyzed the ancestry of natural S. cerevisiae strains and concluded that outcrossing occurs only about once every 50,000 cell divisions. Thus, although S. cerevisiae is heterothallic, it appears that, in nature, mating is most often between closely related yeast cells. The relative rarity in nature of meiotic events that result from outcrossing suggests that the possible long-term benefits of outcrossing (e.g. generation of genetic diversity) are unlikely to be sufficient for generally maintaining sex from one generation to the next. Instead, a short-term benefit, such as meiotic recombinational repair of DNA damages caused by stressful conditions such as starvation, may be the key to the maintenance of sex in S. cerevisiae. Alternatively, recessive deleterious mutations accumulate during the diploid expansion phase, and are purged during selfing: this purging has been termed "genome renewal" and provides an advantage of sex that does not depend on outcrossing.

=== Candida albicans ===
Candida albicans is a diploid fungus that grows both as a yeast and as a filament. C. albicans is the most common fungal pathogen in humans. It causes both debilitating mucosal infections and potentially life-threatening systemic infections. C. albicans has maintained an elaborate, but largely hidden, mating apparatus. Johnson suggested that mating strategies may allow C. albicans to survive in the hostile environment of a mammalian host. In order to mate C. albicans needs to switch from white to opaque cells. The latter are more efficient in mating and referred to as the mating competent cells of C. albicans. Mating in C. albicans is termed a parasexual cycle since meiosis is still not observed in C. albicans.

=== Mating type ===
A picture of the mating type mechanism has begun to emerge from studies of particular fungi such as S. cerevisiae. The mating type genes are located in homeobox and encode enzymes for production of pheromones and pheromone receptors. Sexual reproduction thereby depends on pheromones produced from variant alleles of the same gene. Since sexual reproduction takes place in haploid organisms, it cannot proceed until complementary genes are provided by a suitable partner through cell or hyphal fusion. The number of mating types depends on the number of genes and the number of alleles for each.

Depending on the species, sexual reproduction takes place through gametes or hyphal fusion. When a receptor on one haploid detects a pheromone from a complementary mating type, it approaches the source through chemotropic growth or chemotactic movement if it is a gamete.

== Mating in Basidiomycota ==
Some of the species within Basidiomycota have the most complex systems of sexual reproduction known among fungi. In general for fungi there are two main types of sexual reproduction: homothallism, when mating occurs within a single individual, or in other words each individual is self-fertile; and heterothallism, when hyphae from a single individual are self-sterile and need to interact with another compatible individual for mating to take place. Additionally, mating compatibility in the Basidiomycota is further categorized into two types of mating systems: tetrapolar and bipolar.

=== Tetrapolar and bipolar mating system ===
Heterothallism is the most common mating system in Basidiomycota and in Agaricomycotina (the mushroom-forming fungi) about 90% of the species are heterothallic. The tetrapolar type of mating system is ruled by two unlinked mating loci termed A and B (in Agaricomycotina) or b and a (in Ustilaginomycotina and Pucciniomycotina), both of which can be multiallelic. The combination of A and B (or b and a) alleles, termed mating type, determine the "specificity" or sexual identity of the individual harboring them. Only individuals with different mating types are compatible with each other and therefore able to start the mating event.

A successful mating interaction begins with nuclear exchange and nuclear migration resulting in the formation of dikaryotic hyphae (containing separate haploid nuclei from both initial parents). Dikaryotic hyphae, under the appropriate environmental conditions will give rise to the fruiting body which contains the basidia – specialized cells in which sexual recombination via karyogamy and meiosis occurs. This dikaryotic condition in Basidiomycota is often maintained by a specialized hyphal structure called a clamp connection. The formation of clamp connections is regulated by both mating loci.

Examples of tetrapolar organisms are the smuts Ustilago maydis and U. longissima, and the mushrooms Coprinopsis cinerea, Schizophyllum commune, Pleurotus djamor and Laccaria bicolor.

It is believed that multi-allelic systems favor outcrossing in Basidiomycota. For example, in the case of U. maydis, which bears more than 25 b but only 2 a mating types, an individual has an approximately 50% chance to encounter a compatible mate in nature. However, species such as C. cinerea, which has more than 240 A and B mating types, each, and S. commune, which has more than 339 A mating types and 64 B mating types, approach close to 100% chance of encountering a compatible partner in nature, due to the huge number of mating types generated by these systems.

In contrast, bipolar mating systems are ruled by a single allelic mating locus, termed either A or b. In Agaricomycotina, bipolar organisms mostly have multiple alleles for their A mating locus; however, in Ustilaginomycotina and Pucciniomycotina, the b mating locus is predominantly diallelic, which reduces the occurrence of outcrossing within these species. Bipolarity likely arose via one of two potential routes:

1. During evolution the B or a locus lost functionality in determining mating type, as has occurred in the mushroom Coprinellus disseminatus.
2. Both mating loci have become physically linked such that they now act as a single locus; this has occurred in the smut plant pathogen U. hordei and in the human pathogen Cryptococcus neoformans. Virulence success in these two pathogens is highly associated with mating and their mating type locus.

Other bipolar species include the white rot fungus Phanerochaete chrysosporium and the edible mushroom Pholiota nameko.

=== The A and B or b and a mating loci ===
In the B or a locus there are linked genes that code for pheromones and pheromone receptors. The pheromones are short polypeptides with conserved residues and the pheromone receptors belong to the G protein-coupled family of receptors located in the cell membrane; they sense different molecules (in this case the pheromones) outside and activate a specific pathway inside of the cell. Pheromone-receptor interaction occurs in a way that the pheromone from one individual interacts with the receptor from the partner and vice versa. The functions of these genes are to regulate reciprocal nuclear exchange, nuclear migration in both mates and ultimately clamp cell fusion. The first mating pheromone-receptor genes characterized were for U. maydis.

The A or b mating locus contains genes that code for two types of homeodomain transcription factor proteins, usually tightly linked, that are homologues to the Saccharomyces cerevisiae mating proteins MATα2 and MATa1. In Agaricomycotina the two types of homeodomain transcription factors are termed HD1 and HD2; so the HD1 and HD2 proteins from an individual interacts with the HD2 and HD1 proteins from the other partner, respectively, generating heterodimers able to activate the A transcriptional regulated pathway, which involves formation of clamp cells, coordinated nuclear division and septation.

=== Homothallism ===
Homothallic species may likely have evolved from heterothallic ancestors (Lin and Heitman 2007). In Basidiomycota homothallism is not very common and in Agaricomycotina it is estimated that only 10% of species have homothallic mating behavior. For example, one subspecies of the ectomycorrhizal Basidiomycete Sistotrema brinkmannii is homothallic, although other subspecies have maintained their ability to outcross. Also, a variety of the edible mushroom Agaricus bisporus, (A. bisporus var. eurotetrasporus) produces haploid self-fertile basidiospores. Additionally, in the human pathogen C. neoformans known to outcross under laboratory conditions, both mating types are not normally distributed in natural populations, with the α mating type much more commonly found (>99%), suggesting homothallism is the most prevalent mode of sexual reproduction in ´C. neoformans in nature. Finally, the fungus causing witches' broom in cacao, Moniliophthora perniciosa, has a primarily homothallic biology despite having A and B mating type-like genes in its genome.

Among the 250 known species of aspergilli, about 36% have an identified sexual state Among those Aspergillus species that exhibit a sexual cycle the overwhelming majority in nature are homothallic (self-fertilizing). Selfing in the homothallic fungus Aspergillus nidulans involves activation of the same mating pathways characteristic of sex in outcrossing species, i.e. self-fertilization does not bypass required pathways for outcrossing sex but instead requires activation of these pathways within a single individual. Fusion of haploid nuclei occurs within reproductive structures termed cleistothecia, in which the diploid zygote undergoes meiotic divisions to yield haploid ascospores.

== See also ==
- Mating of yeast
- Mating type
- Mating-type region
- Neurospora crassa
- Dioecy § In mycology
- Fungus § Reproduction
