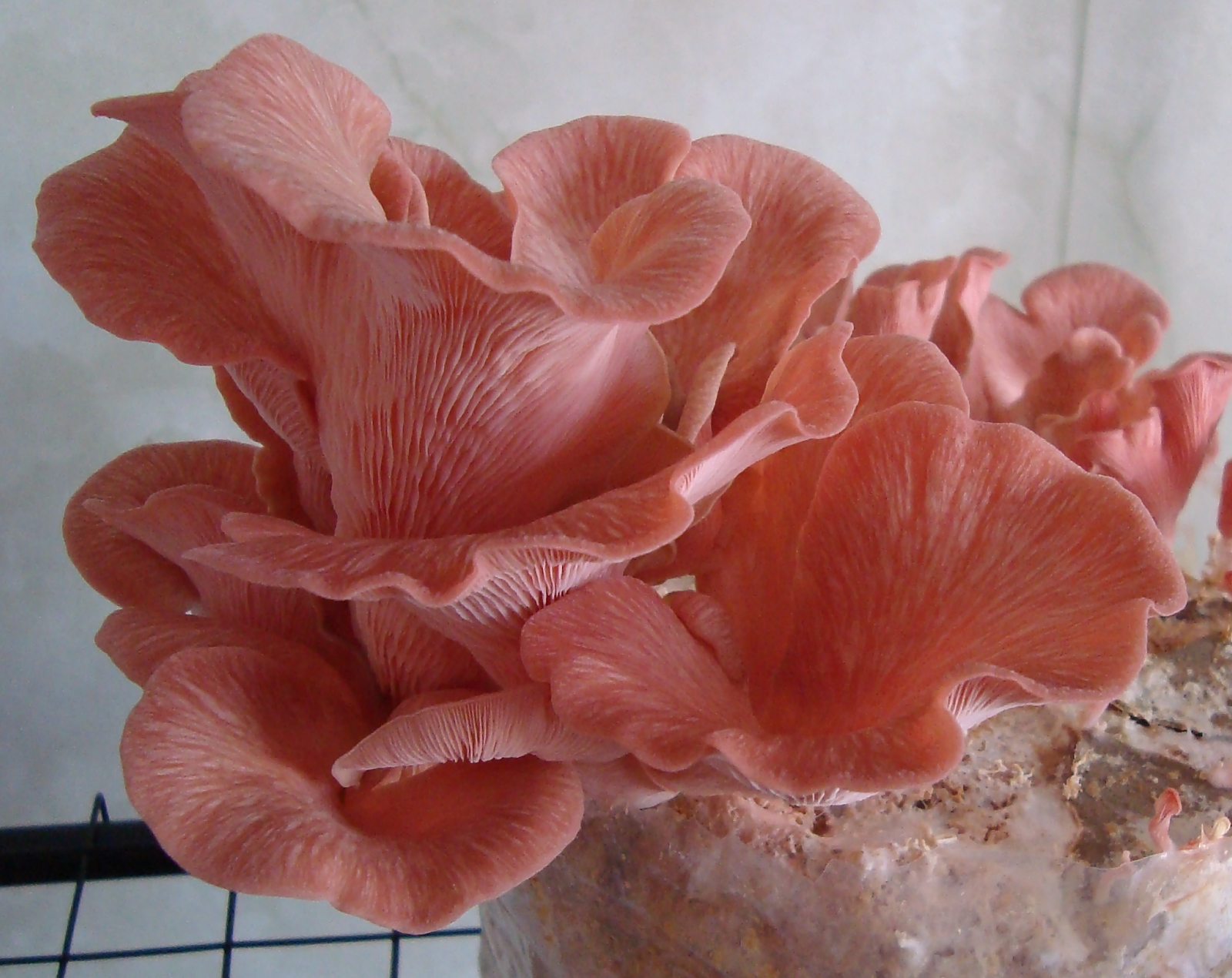

Scientific classification
- Kingdom: Fungi
- Division: Basidiomycota
- Class: Agaricomycetes
- Order: Agaricales
- Family: Pleurotaceae
- Genus: Pleurotus
- Species: P. djamor

Binomial name
- Pleurotus djamor (Rumph. ex Fr.) Boedijn (1959)

= Pleurotus djamor =

Species of fungus

Pleurotus djamor
- Mycological characteristics
- Gills on hymenium
- Cap is offset
- Hymenium is decurrent
- Stipe is bare
- Spore print is pink
- Ecology is saprotrophic
- Edibility is choice

Pleurotus djamor, commonly known as the pink oyster mushroom, is a species of fungus in the family Pleurotaceae.

== Taxonomy ==
It was originally named Boletus secundus arboreus by the German-born botanist Georg Eberhard Rumphius, in 1750. It was sanctioned under the name Agaricus djamor by Elias Magnus Fries in 1821, before he transferred the species to the genus Lentinus. It was transferred to the genus Pleurotus by Karel Bernard Boedijn in 1959.

== Description ==
=== Macroscopic characteristics ===
The pink oyster mushroom has a pink color, though there are also white forms. It has a fan-shaped, broadly convex to plane cap which is 2– 5 cm broad and 3-7 cm long, with an inrolled margin. The gills range from light pink to cream, and are 0.5-0.7 μm in width. The stem is white with matted hairs and is very short or non existent.

The flavor of the pink oyster mushroom has been described as meaty and fishy. Just like most mushrooms, it is quite umami. Its texture is both meaty and chewy. When fried until crispy, it resembles bacon or even ham. However, when it is raw, it has a sour taste.

The reason why it is very rare to find in supermarkets is that it has a shelf life of only about a day, quickly developing an unpleasant amine or urine-like odor after that time. Since it is only harvested from spring to fall, it is only available during those seasons.

=== Microscopic characteristics ===
The spore print is pink, and the spores are inamyloid and ellipsoid. They measure 7-8 ×3-4.5 μm.The basidia measure 24.93-25.26 x 6.7-7.4 μm and have 4 spores each. The sterigmata are 1.5-1.75 μm in size. Clamp connections are present.

== Ecology and distribution ==
The pink oyster mushroom grows in tropical and subtropical areas, growing as far north as Japan and as far south as New Zealand. In Hawai'i, pink oyster mushrooms often grow on fallen coconuts, and on the stalks of palm fronds, though they can also be found on fallen ōhiʻa branches in the forests of the Hawaiian island Kaua'i.

Pleurotus djamor
Nutritional value per 100 g (3.5 oz)
- Energy: 356 kJ (85 kcal)
- Carbohydrates: 52.7 g
- Sugars: 23.10 g
- Dietary fibre: 43.80 g
- Fat: 2.86 g
- Protein: 30.20 g
Vitamins and minerals
Vitamins	Quantity %DV^{†}
Riboflavin (B2)	188% 2.45 mg
Niacin (B3)	411% 65.8 mg
Pantothenic acid (B5)	664% 33.2 mg
Vitamin D	17% 136 IU
Minerals	Quantity %DV^{†}
Calcium	0% 5 mg
Copper	179% 1.61 mg
Iron	61% 11 mg
Potassium	153% 4600 mg
Sodium	1% 13 mg
- Nutritional value per 100 g dried mushroom
- ^{†}Percentages estimated using US recommendations for adults, except for potassium, which is estimated based on expert recommendation from the National Academies.

== Uses and benefits ==
Pink oyster mushrooms are best suited for cooked applications such as sautéing, boiling, roasting, or frying. They can be sautéed or stir-fried with other vegetables, added to pasta dishes, sprinkled on top of pizza, added to grain bowls, sautéed with eggs, boiled in soups, chowders, or stews, or cooked into risotto. They can also be sautéed and mixed with cream-based white sauces for added flavor. Due to their meaty texture, these mushrooms require thorough cooking to develop their flavor and an edible consistency.

Pink oyster mushrooms are widely cultivated. They require less water spraying during fruiting than the Italian oyster. Pink oyster mushrooms can be grown at relatively warm temperatures of 25-30°C. They can be cultivated on barley straw, sawdust, tea leaves and wheat straw. Pink oyster mushrooms contain high levels of vitamin C and potassium compared to other mushrooms.

== Cultural significance ==
Pink oyster mushrooms are a commonly found specimen in central Mexican communities. It is the most well known mushroom in Tlayacapan, Morelos. The species is collected by families and then often sold at vendors markets. Locals call it a variety of names: "seta", "cazahuate", "orejón", "hongo de pino", "blanco", "oreja de cazahuate". Pink oyster mushrooms are also sold door-to-door by mestizos in mountainous communities, such as San Lorenzo de Atzqueltán and Izolta.

== See also ==
- List of Pleurotus species
