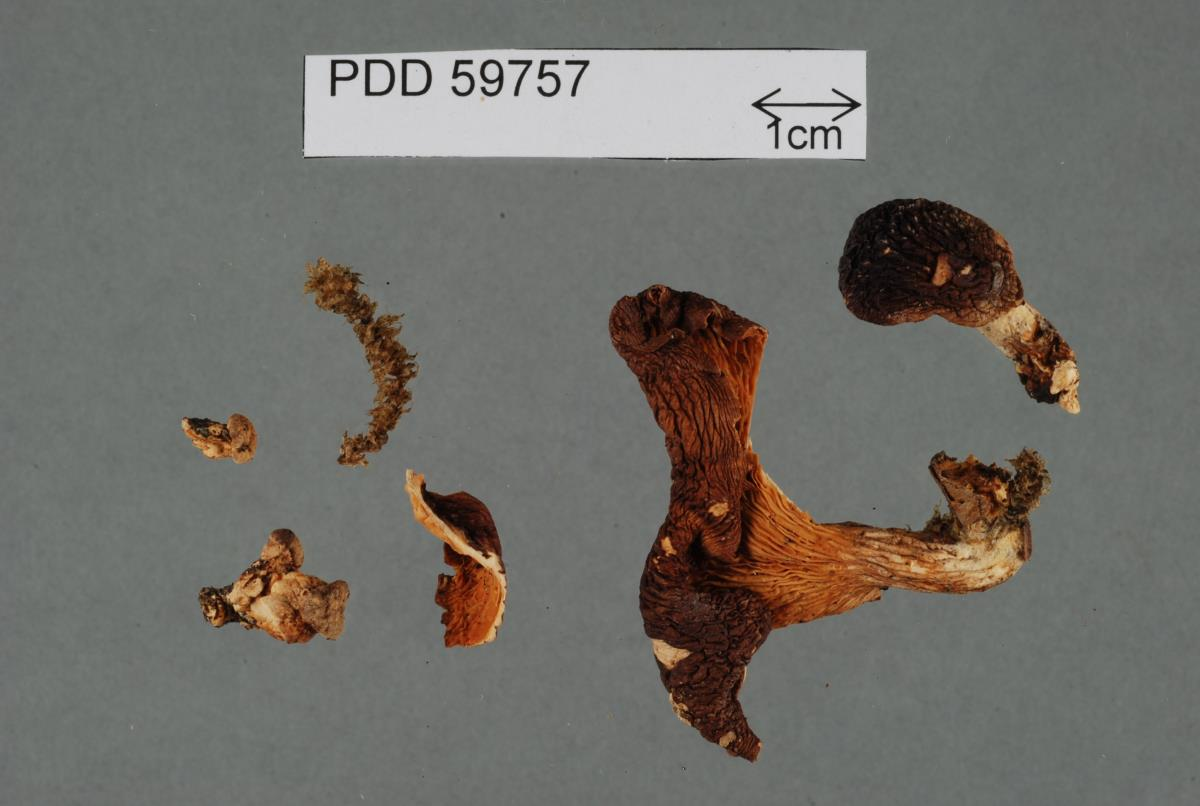

Scientific classification
- Domain: Eukaryota
- Kingdom: Fungi
- Division: Basidiomycota
- Class: Agaricomycetes
- Order: Agaricales
- Family: Pleurotaceae
- Genus: Pleurotus
- Species: P. velatus

Binomial name
- Pleurotus velatus Segedin, P. K. Buchanan & J. P. Wilkie, 1995

= Pleurotus velatus =

Species of fungus

Pleurotus velatus is a species of fungus in the genus Pleurotus first described in 1995, endemic to New Zealand.

== Description ==
The cap is 30–10 x 20–80 mm and convex, with dark grey surface. It is first covered with fine grey, floccose squamules, and smoothens with age, drying orange-brown. The stem is cylindric, solid, strongly eccentric, up to 20 mm by 12 mm, pale brown, becoming more yellow towards gills, and tomentose towards base. The gills are decurrent and white, drying greyish orange. A partial veil is well developed, and does not leave a recognisable ring.

The spore print is unknown. Spores are 6.5–10 x 3.5–4.5 μm (mean, 8.75 x 3.75 μm) in extent, oblong to oblong-cylindric and smooth.

The species is similar to Pleurotus dryinus from the same subgenus (Lentodiopsis), but has smaller spores and a darker pileus.

== Distribution and habitat ==
This mushroom is saprobic on dead wood in coastal forests of New Zealand.
