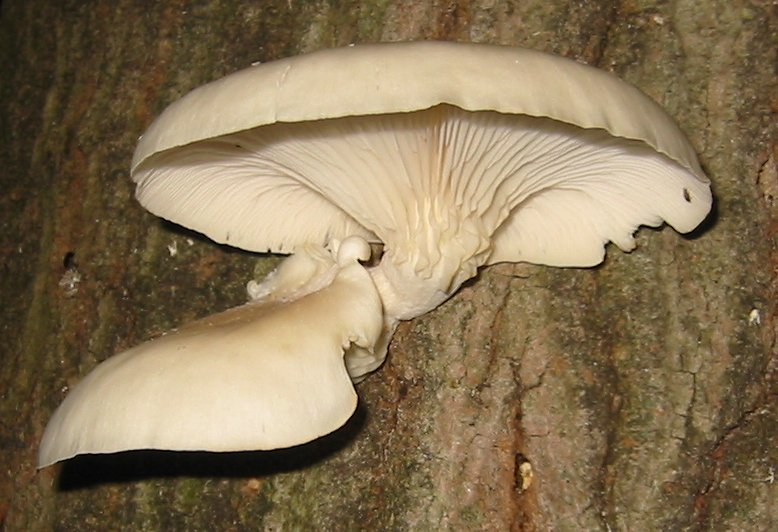
- Pleurotus ostreatus

Scientific classification
- Kingdom: Fungi
- Division: Basidiomycota
- Class: Agaricomycetes
- Order: Agaricales
- Family: Pleurotaceae
- Genus: Pleurotus (Fr.) P. Kumm. 1871

Type species
- Pleurotus ostreatus (Jacq.) P. Kumm. 1871

= Pleurotus =

Genus of fungi

Pleurotus
- Mycological characteristics
- Gills on hymenium
- Cap is offset
- Hymenium is decurrent
- Stipe is bare
- Spore print is white
- Ecology is saprotrophic or parasitic
- Edibility is edible or choice

Pleurotus is a genus of gilled mushrooms with species known as oyster, abalone, or tree mushrooms. It includes some of the most commonly cultivated edible mushrooms in the world, such as P. ostreatus. Additionally, some species have been used in the mycoremediation of pollutants.

== Description ==
The caps may be laterally attached (with no stipe). If there is a stipe, it is normally eccentric and the gills are decurrent along it. The term pleurotoid is used for any mushroom with this general shape.

The spores are smooth and elongated (described as "cylindrical"). Where hyphae meet, they are joined by clamp connections. Pleurotus is not considered to be a bracket fungus, and most of the species are monomitic (with a soft consistency). However, remarkably, P. dryinus can sometimes be dimitic, meaning that it has additional skeletal hyphae, which give it a tougher consistency like bracket fungi.

In the American Pacific Northwest, oysters can be found from March to May.

== Taxonomy ==
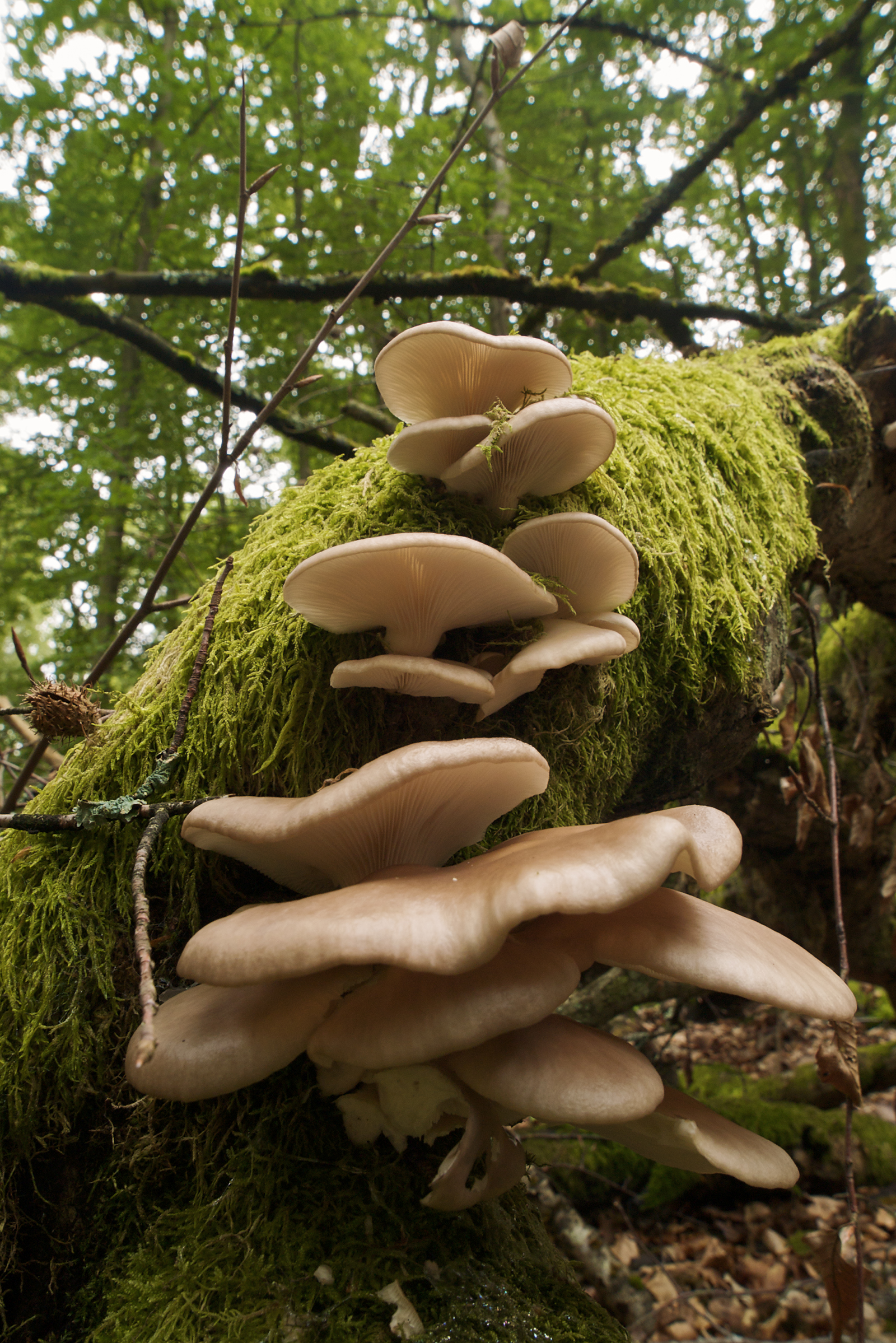
P. pulmonarius, Sweden

The classification of species within the genus Pleurotus is difficult due to high phenotypic variability across wide geographic ranges, geographic overlap of species, and ongoing evolution and speciation. Early taxonomic efforts placed the oyster mushrooms within a very broad Agaricus as Agaricus ostreatus (Jacq. 1774). Paul Kummer defined the genus Pleurotus in 1871; since then, the genus has been narrowed with some species reclassified to other genera, such as Favolaschia, Hohenbuehelia, Lentinus, Marasmiellus, Omphalotus, Panellus, Pleurocybella, and Resupinatus. See Singer (1986) for an example of Pleurotus taxonomy based on morphological characteristics.

=== Phylogeny ===
More recently, molecular phylogenetics has been utilized to determine genetic and evolutionary relationships between groups within the genus, delineating discrete clades. Pleurotus, along with the closely related genus Hohenbuehelia, has been shown to be monophyletic. Tests of cross-breeding viability between groups have been used to further define which groups are deserving of species rank, as opposed to subspecies, variety, or synonymy. If two groups of morphologically distinct Pleurotus fungi are able to cross-breed and produce fertile offspring, they meet one definition of species. These reproductively discrete groups, referred to as intersterility groups, have begun to be defined in Pleurotus. Many binomial names used in literature are now being grouped together as species complexes using this technique, and may change.

==== Phylogenetic species ====
The following species list is organized according to 1. phylogenetic clade, 2. intersterility group (group number in Roman numerals) or sub-clade, and then 3. any older binomial names that have been found to be closely related, reproductively compatible, or synonymous, although they may no longer be taxonomically valid. This list is likely to be incomplete.

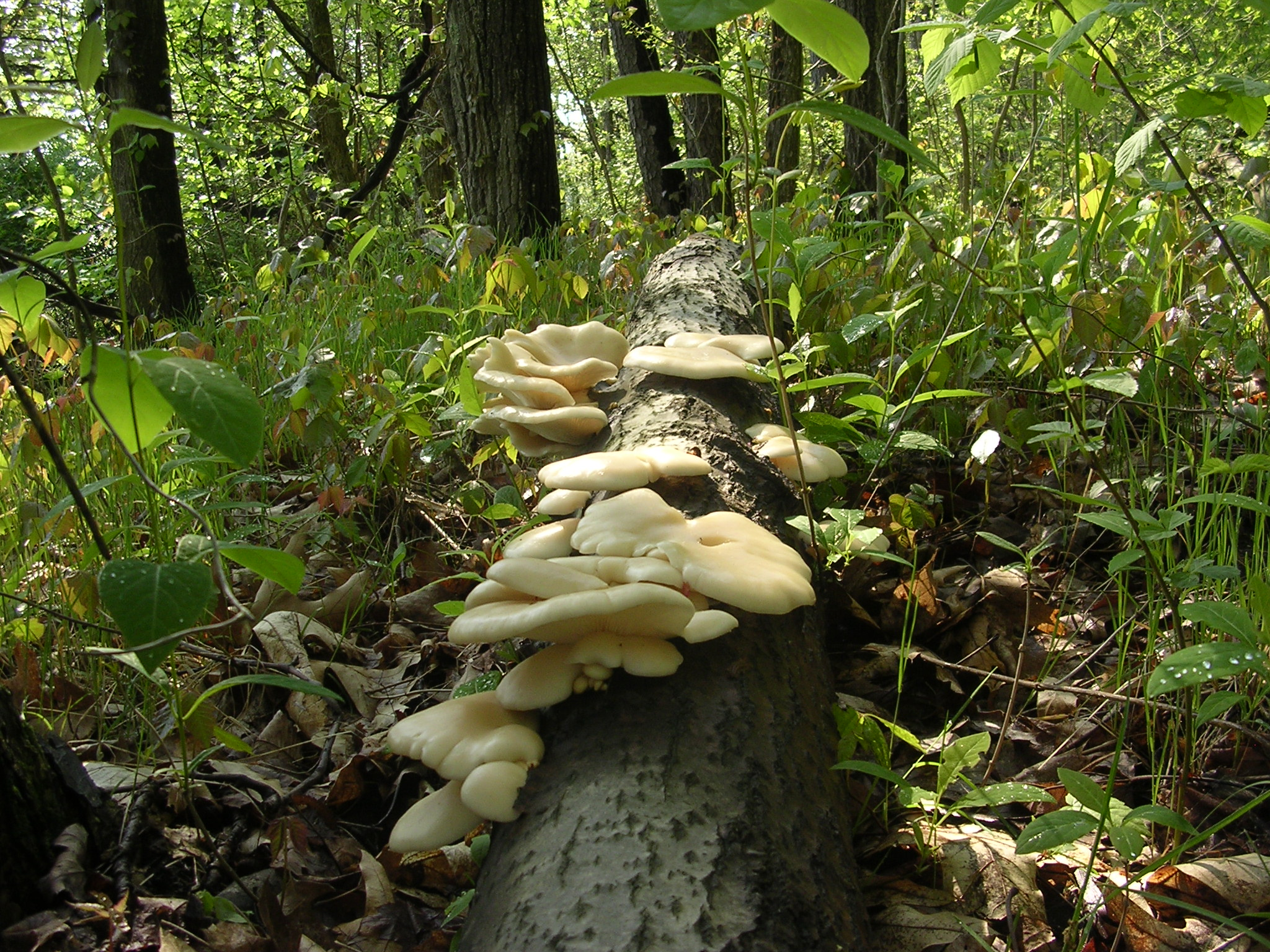
P. populinus, Pennsylvania, USA

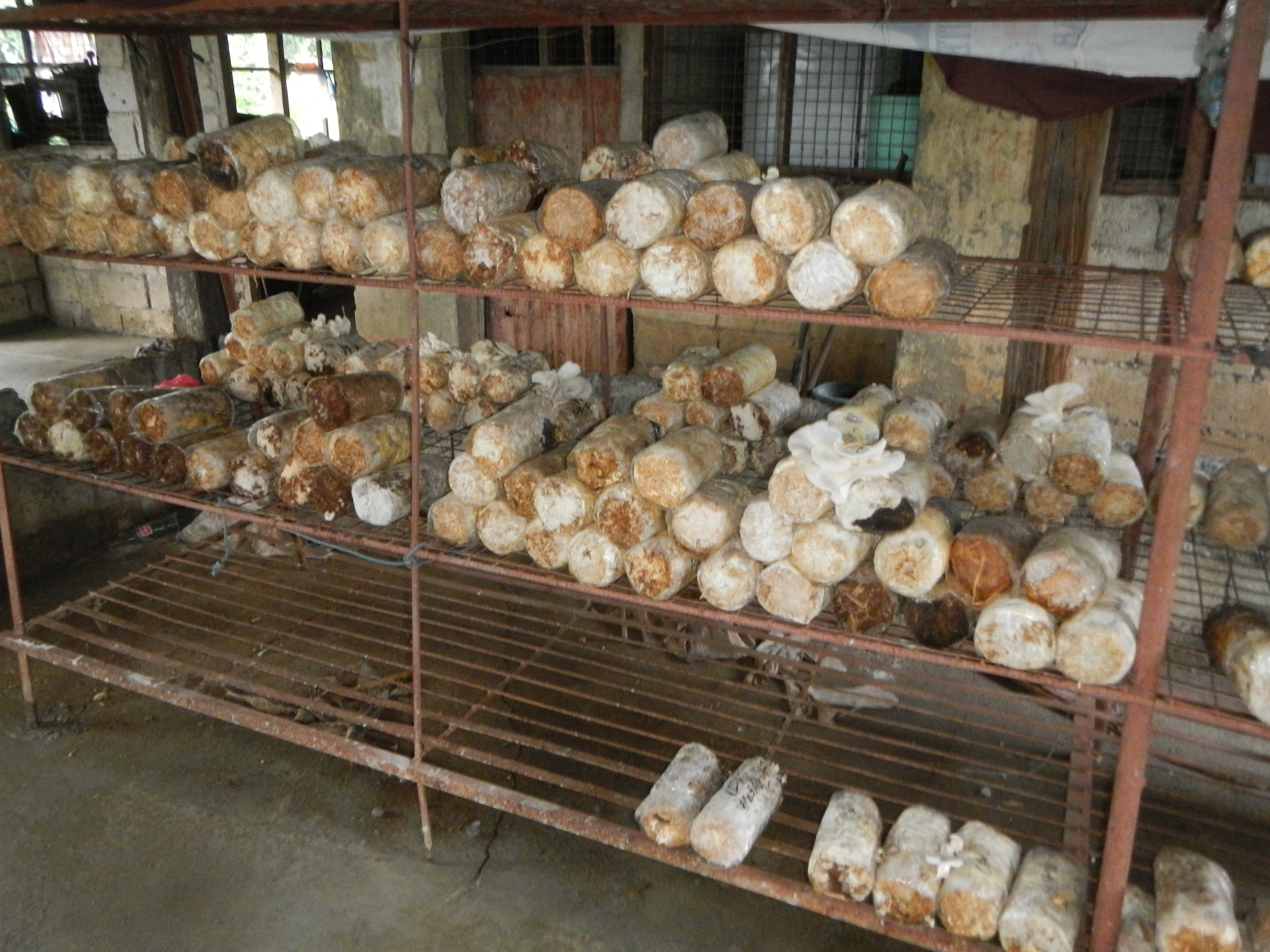
Pleurotus mushrooms production at the Agricultural Science and Technology School, Science City of Muñoz, Philippines

- P. ostreatus clade
  - I. P. ostreatus (oyster or pearl oyster mushroom) – North America and northern Eurasia
    - P. florida
  - II. P. pulmonarius (phoenix or Indian oyster mushroom) – North America, Eurasia, and Australasia
    - P. columbinus
    - P. sapidus
  - III. P. populinus – North America
  - VI. P. eryngii (king oyster mushroom) – Europe and the Middle East
    - P. ferulae
    - P. fossulatus – Afghanistan
    - P. nebrodensis
  - XII. P. abieticola – Asia
  - XIII. P. albidus – Caribbean, Central America, South America
- P. djamor-cornucopiae clade
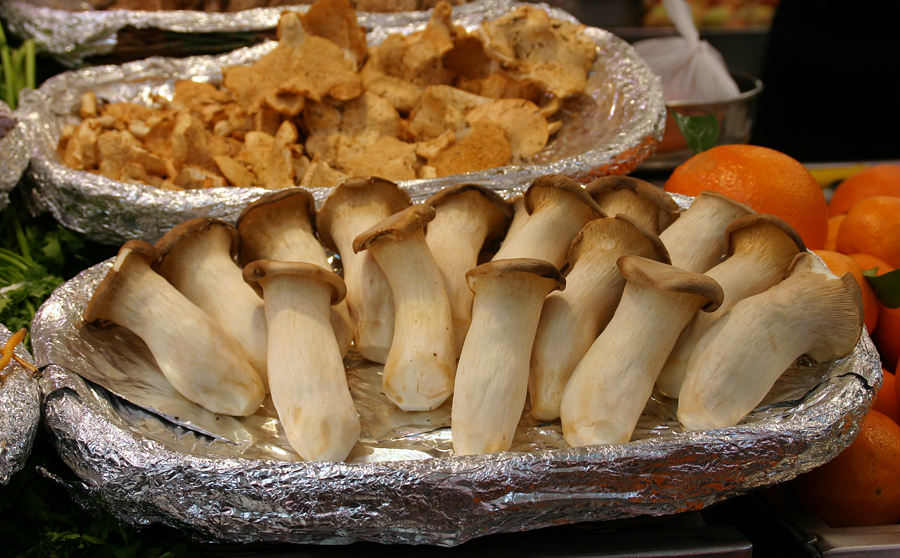
  P. eryngii, Spain
  - IV. P. cornucopiae (branched oyster mushroom) – Europe
    - P. citrinopileatus (golden oyster mushroom) – eastern Asia
    - P. euosmus (tarragon oyster mushroom)
  - V. P. djamor (pink oyster mushroom) – pantropical
    - P. flabellatus
    - P. salmoneo-stramineus
    - P. salmonicolor
  - XI. P. opuntiae – North America, New Zealand
  - XVI. P. calyptratus
- P. cystidiosus clade
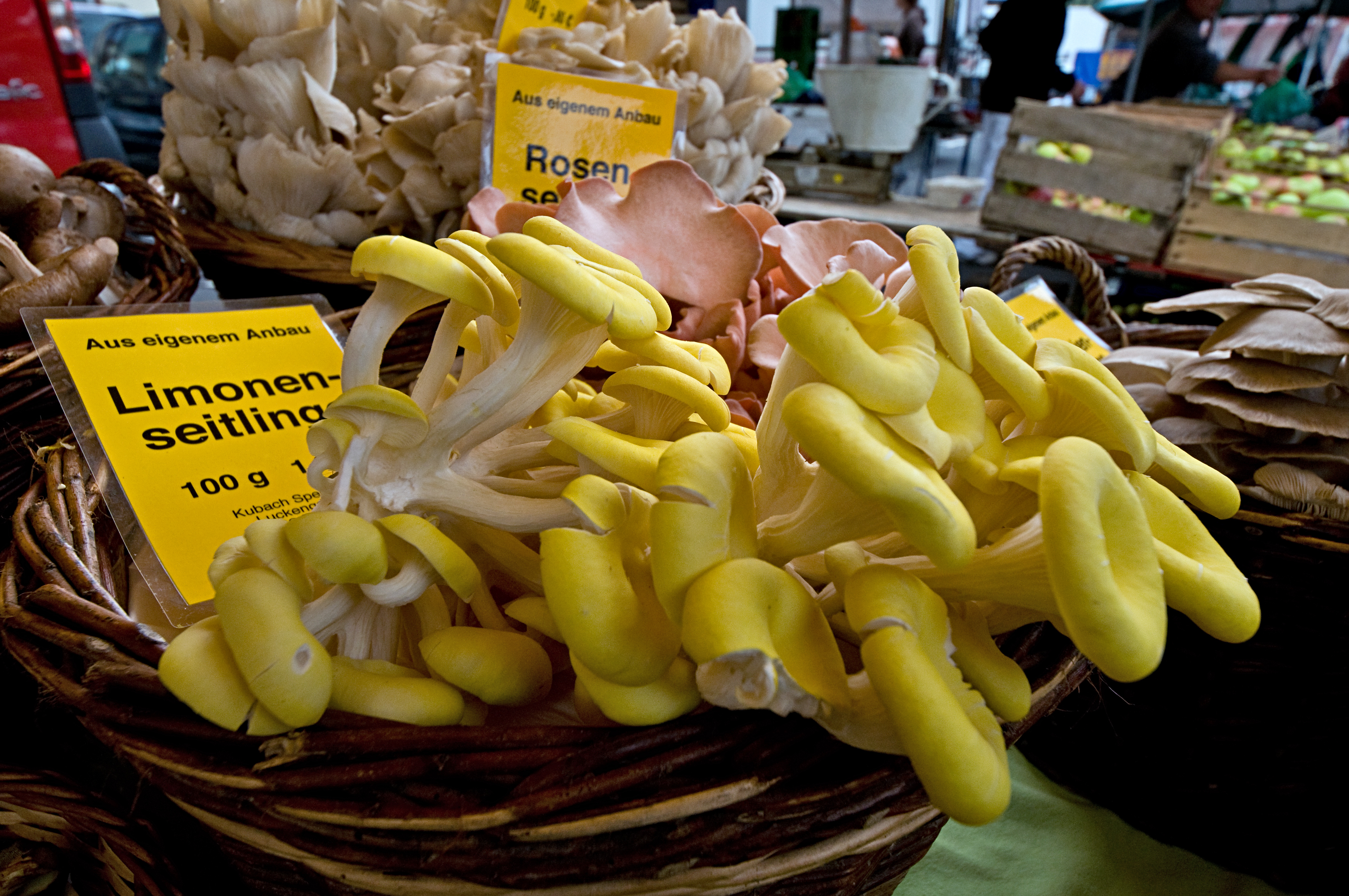
  P. citrinopileatus
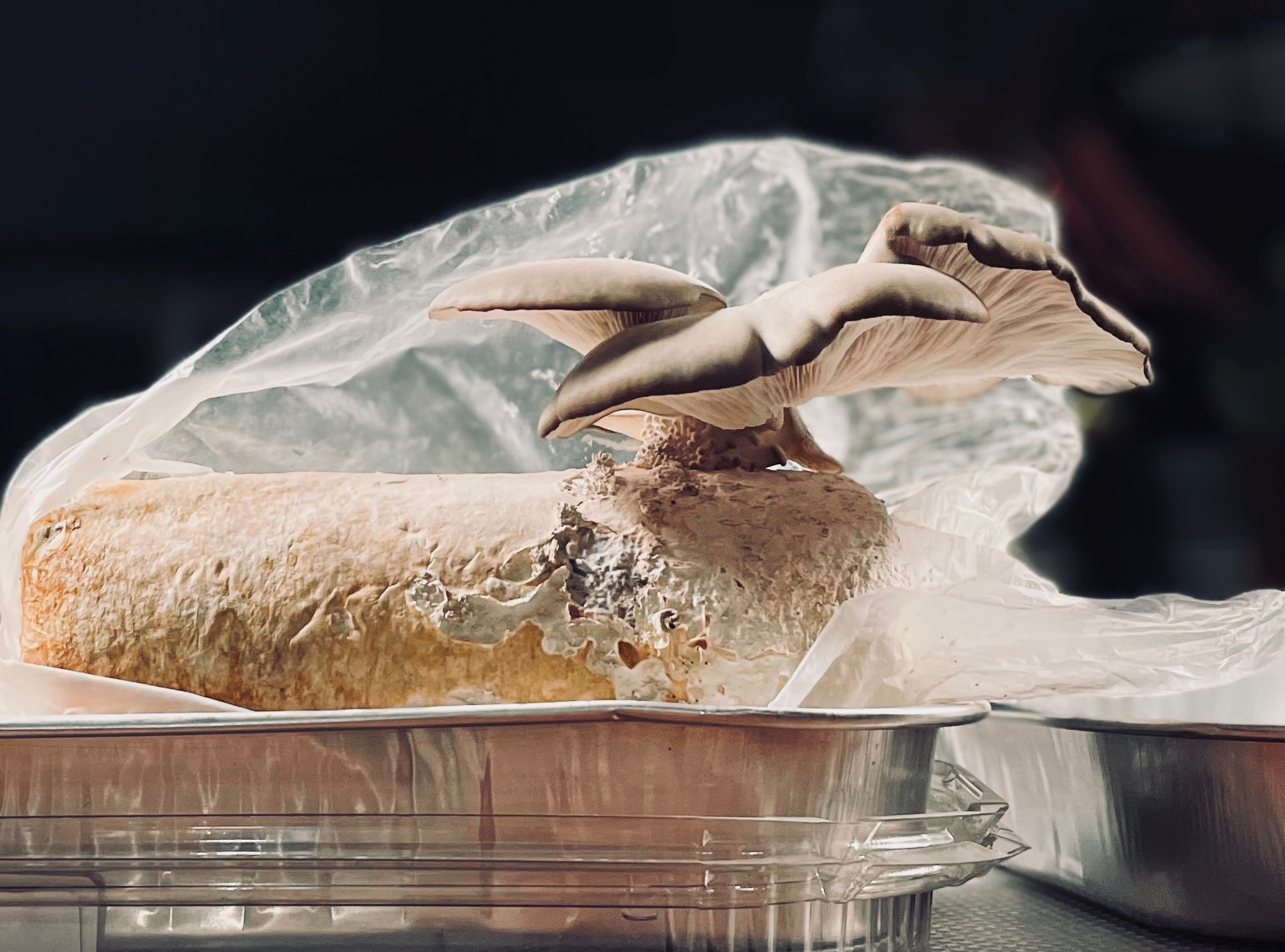
  P. ostreatus home-grown
  - VII. P. cystidiosus (abalone mushroom) – global
    - P. abalonus – Taiwan
    - P. fuscosquamulosus – Africa, Europe
    - P. smithii – Mexico
  - IX. P. dryinus – North America, Europe, and New Zealand
- VIII. Lentinus levis – subtropical to tropical, moved to genus Lentinus.
- X. P. tuber-regium (king tuber mushroom) – Africa, Asia, Australasia
- XIV. P. australis (brown oyster mushroom) – Australia and New Zealand
- XV. P. purpureo-olivaceus – Australia and New Zealand
  - P. rattenburyi

==== Incertae sedis species ====
- P. parsonsii
- P. velatus

==== Former species ====
- P. gardneri was reclassified to the genus Neonothopanus in 2011.
- P. levis was reclassified to the genus Lentinus.
- P. sajor-caju was reclassified to the genus Lentinus.
- P. nidiformis was reclassified to the genus Omphalotus in 1994.

=== Etymology ===
The genus name Pleurotus refers to the mushroom caps being laterally attached to the substrate. It is derived of the Ancient Greek word πλευρόν: pleurón rib, side.

== Ecology ==
Pleurotus fungi are found in both tropical and temperate climates throughout the world. Most species of Pleurotus are white-rot fungi on hardwood trees, although some also decay conifer wood. Pleurotus eryngii is unusual in being a weak parasite of herbaceous plants, and P. tuber-regium produces underground sclerotia.

In addition to being saprotrophic, all species of Pleurotus are also nematophagous, catching nematodes by paralyzing them with a toxin. In the case of the carnivorous mushroom Pleurotus ostreatus, it was shown that small, fragile lollipop-shaped structures (toxocysts) on fungal hyphae contain a volatile ketone, 3-octanone, which disrupts the cell membrane integrity of nematodes, leading to rapid cell and organismal death, hypothetically either to defend themselves and/or to acquire nutrients.

This genus is a favorite or even exclusive food of many pleasing fungus beetles (family Erotylidae). Species recorded from Pleurotus include Dacne quadrimaculata, and especially the breast-plated triplax Triplax thoracica and its cryptic species complex, consisting of T.californica, T.cuneata, T.dissimulator, T.errans, T.flavicollis, T.frosti, T.lacensis, T.mesosternalis, T.microgaster, T.puncticeps and T.wehrlei. Most members of the species complex seem to require Pleurotus, and in some cases P.ostreatus specifically, as larval food. Spondotriplax pallidipes (formerly Tritoma pallidipes) eats golden oyster mushroom (P.citrinopileatus ), perhaps in preference to other Pleurotus species, and can become a crop pest, as has been reported for the related Mycotretus apicalis on "Pleurotus sajor-caju", and possibly also for species of Pseudischyrus, another closely related beetle. In addition, the tooth-necked fungus beetle genus Derodontus and the rove beetle genus Phanerota have been noted to feed on oyster mushrooms and have distinct preferences for different Pleurotus species.

== Uses ==
=== Culinary ===
Oyster mushrooms are some of the most commonly cultivated edible mushrooms. They are prepared by being torn up or sliced, especially in stir fry or sauté, because they are consistently thin, and so will cook more evenly than uncut mushrooms of other types. They are often used in vegetarian cuisine.

The crew of the Fram2 orbital mission are planning to grow oyster mushrooms in space for the first time. The code name for this experiment is Mission MushVroom, and is led by FOODiQ Global, an Australian company. If successful, these mushrooms could provide a sustainable food source during lengthy space missions.

=== Bioremediation ===
Pleurotus fungi have been used in the mycoremediation of pollutants, such as petroleum and polycyclic aromatic hydrocarbons.

The 2007 Cosco Busan oil spill was remediated partly by using 1,000 mats of human hair collected from Bay Area salons woven into mats, then used to grow oyster mushrooms, helping to absorb the oil.

After the 2017 Tubbs Fire in California, oyster mushrooms were grown to help remediate toxic ash run-off.

== See also ==
- Antromycopsis – an anamorphic form of Pleurotus
- List of Pleurotus species
