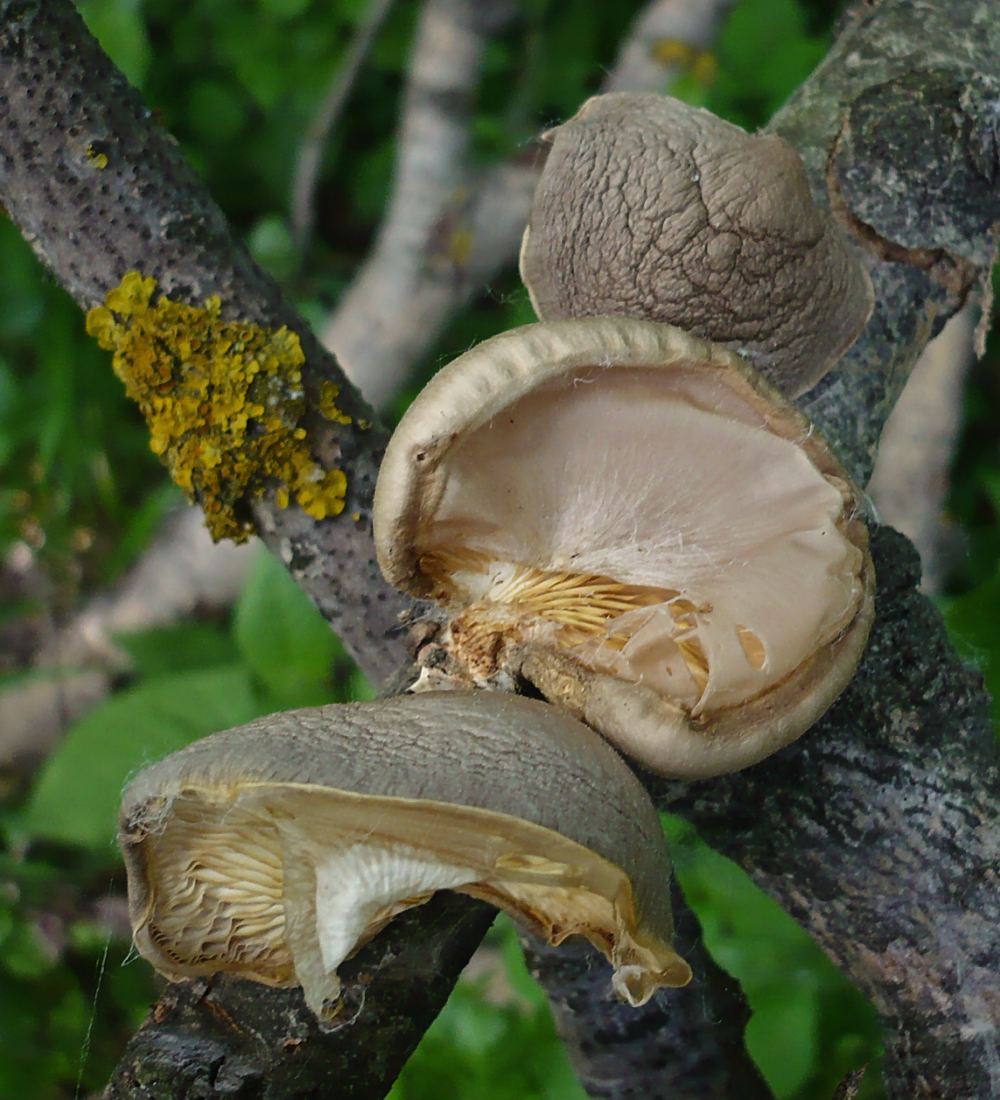

Scientific classification
- Kingdom: Fungi
- Division: Basidiomycota
- Class: Agaricomycetes
- Order: Agaricales
- Family: Pleurotaceae
- Genus: Pleurotus
- Species: P. calyptratus

Binomial name
- Pleurotus calyptratus (Lindblad ex Fr.) Sacc.

Synonyms
- Agaricus calyptratus Lindblad ex Fr. 1857; Dendrosarcus calyptratus (Lindblad ex Fr.) Kuntze 1898; Pleurotus djamor f. calyptratus (Lindblad ex Fr.) R.H. Petersen 2002; Tectella calyptrata (Lindblad ex Fr.) Singer 1943.

= Pleurotus calyptratus =

Species of fungus

Pleurotus calyptratus
- Mycological characteristics
- Gills on hymenium
- Cap is offset
- Hymenium is decurrent
- Spore print is white
- Edibility is edible

Pleurotus calyptratus (syn. Lentodiopsis calyptrata, Tectella calyptrata) is a species of fungus from the family Pleurotaceae. It has a distinctive delicate veil on young fruiting bodies. Phylogenetic research has shown that while it belongs to the P. djamor-cornucopiae clade, it forms its own intersterility group.

== Appearance ==
=== Macroscopic features ===
The 2.5–10 cm large fruiting bodies of Pleurotus calyptratus are semicircular, shell-shaped to kidney-shaped. The pileus surface is smooth, wrinkled with age, bald and at least a bit greasy in damp weather. The color spectrum ranges from pale brownish-grey to light grey-blue. Older specimens may fade to cream to whitish. The white, later yellowing, skin-like veil that stretches from the cap edges over the lamellae in young fruiting bodies is striking. The partial velum tears open during growth and ragged remnants get stuck at the edges. The lamellae are densely packed and like to have slightly jagged edges. They are white to cream-colored, yellowish to ocher-brown when old. The white spore powder darkens to a creamy yellow as it dries. The laterally grown stem is either short or absent. The flesh is white in color and does not change color when cut. It smells and tastes pleasantly, sweet like fruit or honey, but also floury.

=== Microscopic features ===
The cylindrical to slenderly elliptical spores are 10.5–15.5 μm long, (3)4–5 μm wide and show no iodine color reaction. Cystidia are absent. The lamella trama has a dimitic structure. The 2–3.5 μm wide skeletal hyphae are thick-walled, relatively short, and have neither septa nor clamp connections.

== Ecology ==
Like Pleurotus dryinus, Pleurotus calyptratus parasites the weak – it affects trees weakened by drought or waterlogging. After the host has died, the fungus can continue to feed on the substrate as a saprobiont for some time. It causes intense white rot in the heartwood. The species mainly inhabits trunks, stumps and fallen branches of poplars, especially white and trembling poplars. The fungus is also very rare on willows and rowanberries.

== Distribution ==
The mushroom lives in Europe in the temperate to subarctic climate zones. In Central Europe there are reports of finds from Germany, Croatia, Poland, Liechtenstein, Austria, Slovakia, Czech Republic and Hungary. In northern Europe, the species has so far only been found in Finland and Sweden. In Germany, only isolated finds from the southern federal states of Bavaria and Baden-Württemberg are known.

It is recognized on the lists of endangered species in Poland, Sweden and Finland.

The fungus has not established itself in Baden-Württemberg. It was able to benefit little from the spread of the trembling poplar, planted by humans as soil-preparing forest pioneers after World War II. Since the tree was no longer promoted, the Pleurotus calyptratus has been doomed to extinction. However, protective measures are considered to be of little use.

== Economical meaning ==
Pleurotus calyptratus is an edible mushroom, as a tree and wood parasite it is insignificant due to its rarity.

== Sources ==
=== Literature ===
- Josef Breitenbach, Fred Kränzlin (Hrsg.): Pilze der Schweiz. Beitrag zur Kenntnis der Pilzflora der Schweiz. Band 3: Röhrlinge und Blätterpilze. Teil 1: Strobilomycetaceae und Boletaceae, Paxillaceae, Gomphidiacea, Hygrophoracea, Tricholomataceae, Polyporaceae (lamellige). Mykologia, Luzern 1991, ISBN 3-85604-030-7.
