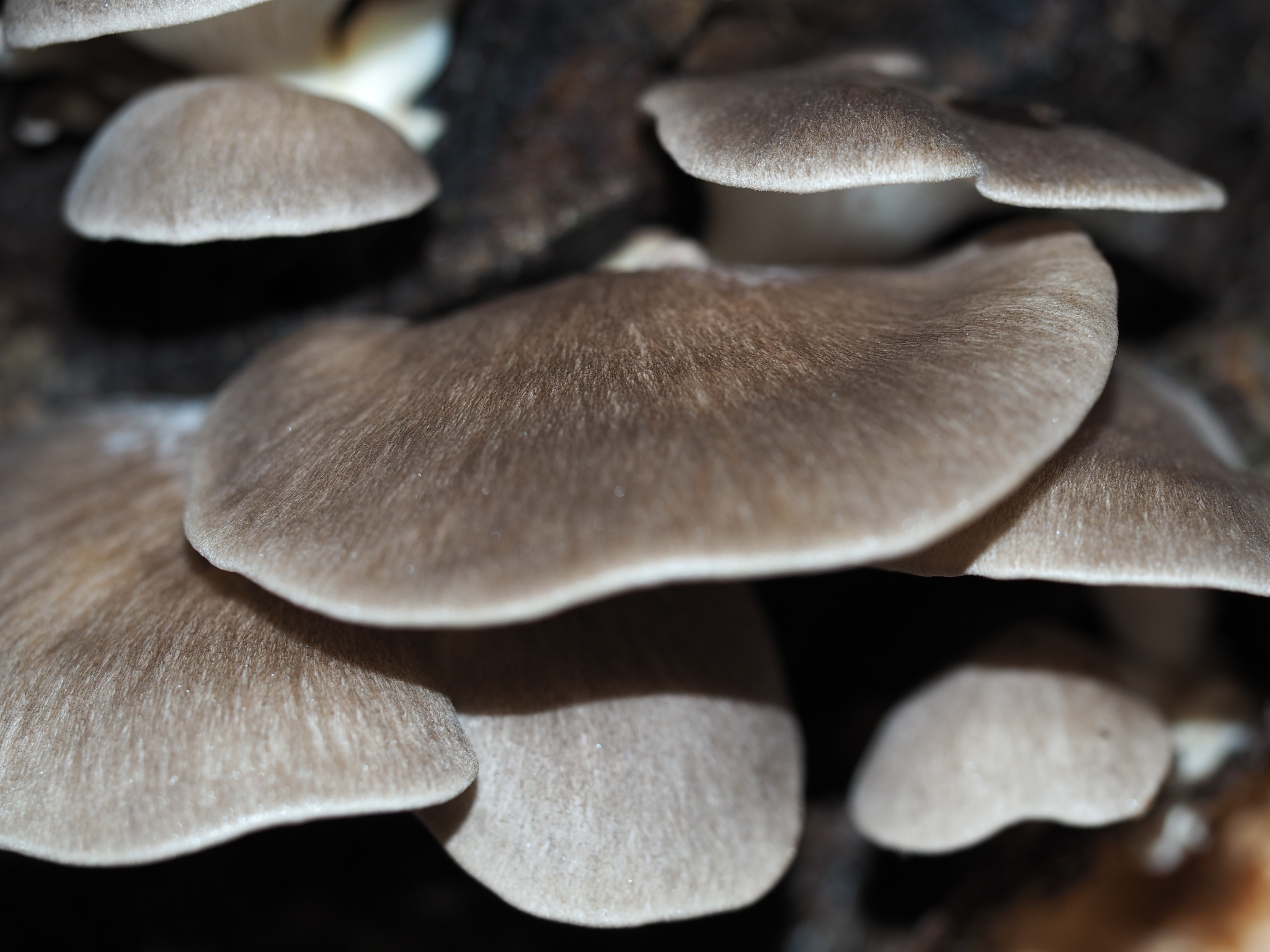

Scientific classification
- Kingdom: Fungi
- Division: Basidiomycota
- Class: Agaricomycetes
- Order: Agaricales
- Family: Pleurotaceae
- Genus: Pleurotus
- Species: P. parsonsiae

Binomial name
- Pleurotus parsonsiae G. Stev., 1964

Synonyms
- Pleurotus salignus sensu Colenso; fide Segedin & Pennycook (2001); Pleurotus salignus sensu Massee; fide Buchanan & Ryvarden (2000)

= Pleurotus parsonsiae =

Species of fungus

Pleurotus parsonsiae
- Mycological characteristics
- Gills on hymenium
- Cap is offset or depressed
- Hymenium is decurrent
- Stipe is bare
- Spore print is white
- Ecology is saprotrophic or parasitic
- Edibility is edible

Pleurotus parsonsiae, also known as velvet oyster mushroom, is a species of edible fungus in the genus Pleurotus, endemic to New Zealand.

== Description ==
=== General ===
- The cap grows from 7 to about 12 cm, creamy fawn, darker when wet or grey yellow, darker towards margin, paler towards stipe, drying ochraceous, orbicular with margin, down-rolled at first and later splitting. It is dry, smooth, matt to finely fibrillose, hence the "velvet" common name.
- The flesh is creamy white.
- The stem is short, sometimes absent, from 8 by 8 mm., to 1 by1.5 cm.
- The gills are decurrent to deeply decurrent, creamy, moderately crowded, thin, deep, with margins becoming lacerate.
- The spore print is white, becoming creamy.

=== Microscopic characteristics ===
- The spores are around 9-11 μm by 4-4.5 μm, non-amyloid, thin-walled.

=== Distribution, habitat and ecology ===
This mushroom is saprobic on dead wood, preferring Sophora sp., Leptospermum scoparium, Eucalyptus sp., andCordyline australis. It is endemic to New Zealand. The phylogenetic research of Pleurotus genus has classified P. parsonsiae as incertae sedis with regards to clades and intersterility groups.

== Human impact ==
This mushroom is edible and it can be cultivated. Grow kits and cultures are sold in New Zealand as an alternative to illegal invasive species of Pleurotus.
