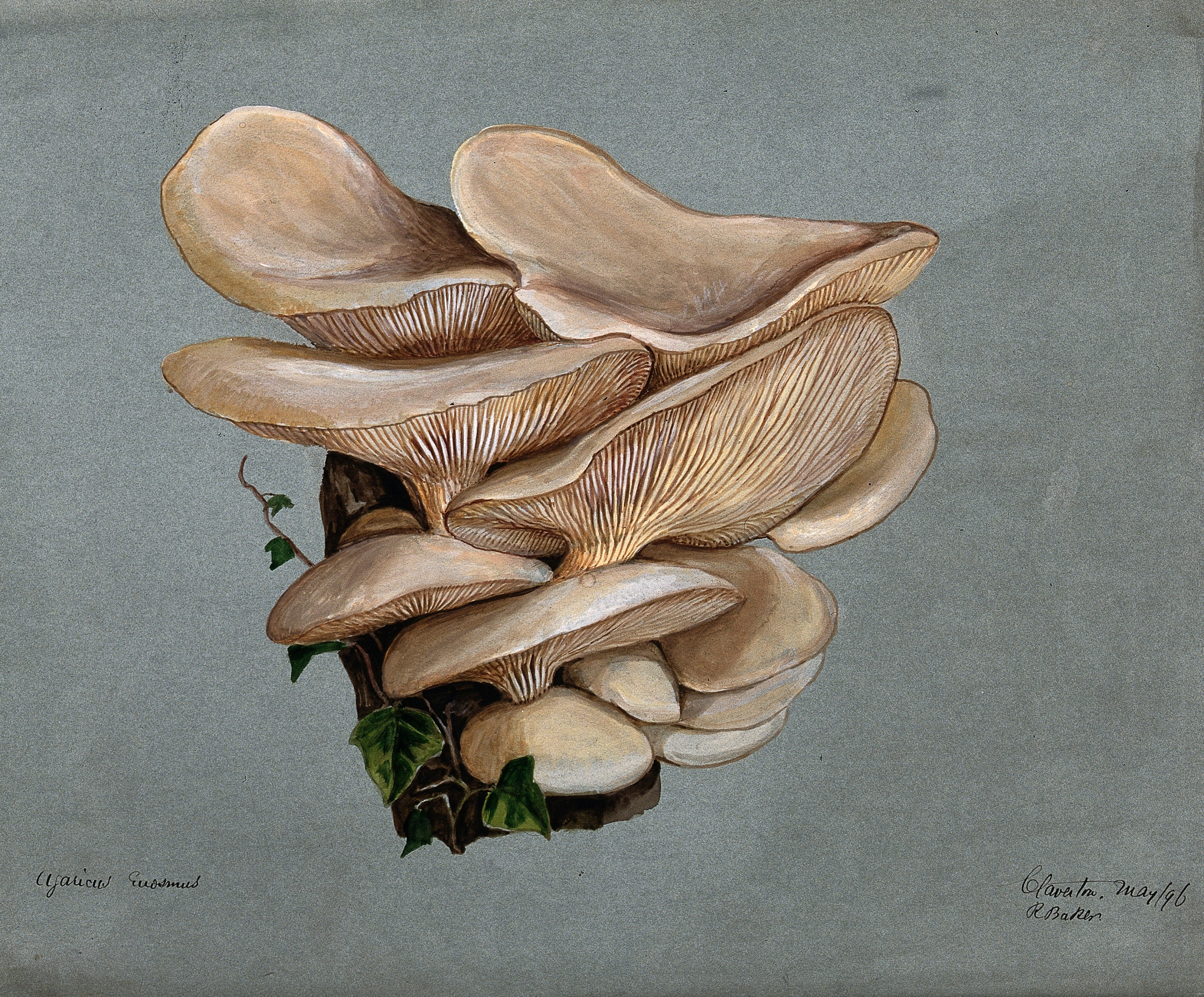

Scientific classification
- Domain: Eukaryota
- Kingdom: Fungi
- Division: Basidiomycota
- Class: Agaricomycetes
- Order: Agaricales
- Family: Pleurotaceae
- Genus: Pleurotus
- Species: P. euosmus

Binomial name
- Pleurotus euosmus (Berk.) Sacc., 1887

Synonyms
- Pleurotus ostreatus euosmus (Berk.) Massee, 1893

= Pleurotus euosmus =

Pleurotus euosmus Mycological characteristics
- Gills on hymenium
- Cap is convex or depressed
- Hymenium is decurrent
- Stipe is bare
- Spore print is pink
- Ecology is saprotrophic or parasitic
- Edibility is choice

Pleurotus euosmus, also known as tarragon oyster mushroom, is a species of edible fungus in the genus Pleurotus, It is quite similar to the better-known Pleurotus ostreatus, but it is distinguished by its strong smell reminiscent of tarragon and substantially larger spores.

== Description ==
=== General ===
- The cap grows from 5 to about 15 cm, with beige-tan to dingy-brown surface. It is first convex, becoming plane and then depressed with age.
- The stem is short, sometimes absent, may be forked and can vary from excentric to fairly central. Each stem may be up to about 12 cm long and up to 2 cm thick.
- The dingy gills are decurrent down the stem and broad.
- The spore print is pale pinkish-lilac.

=== Microscopic characteristics ===
- The spores in the form of a rather elongated ellipsoid are around 12-14 μm by 4-5 μm.

=== Distribution, habitat & ecology ===
This mushroom is saprotrophic and can also be a weak parasite. It occurs in stumps and fallen trunks, preferring elms. It is fairly rare, limited to the British Isles, reported only in England and Scotland.

=== Similar species ===
Pleurotus euosmus is quite similar to the well-known food mushroom Pleurotus ostreatus, to the point of Watling & Gregory having considered P. euosmus a variety of P. ostreatus. However, later phylogenetic research has shown it is more closely related to Pleurotus citrinopileatus and Pleurotus cornucopiae, belonging to their intersterility group in P. djamor-cornucopiae clade.

== Human impact ==
This mushroom is edible and it can be cultivated in a manner similar to P. ostreatus. It is cultivated by individual hobbyists, but not cultivated on a wide/commercial scale.
