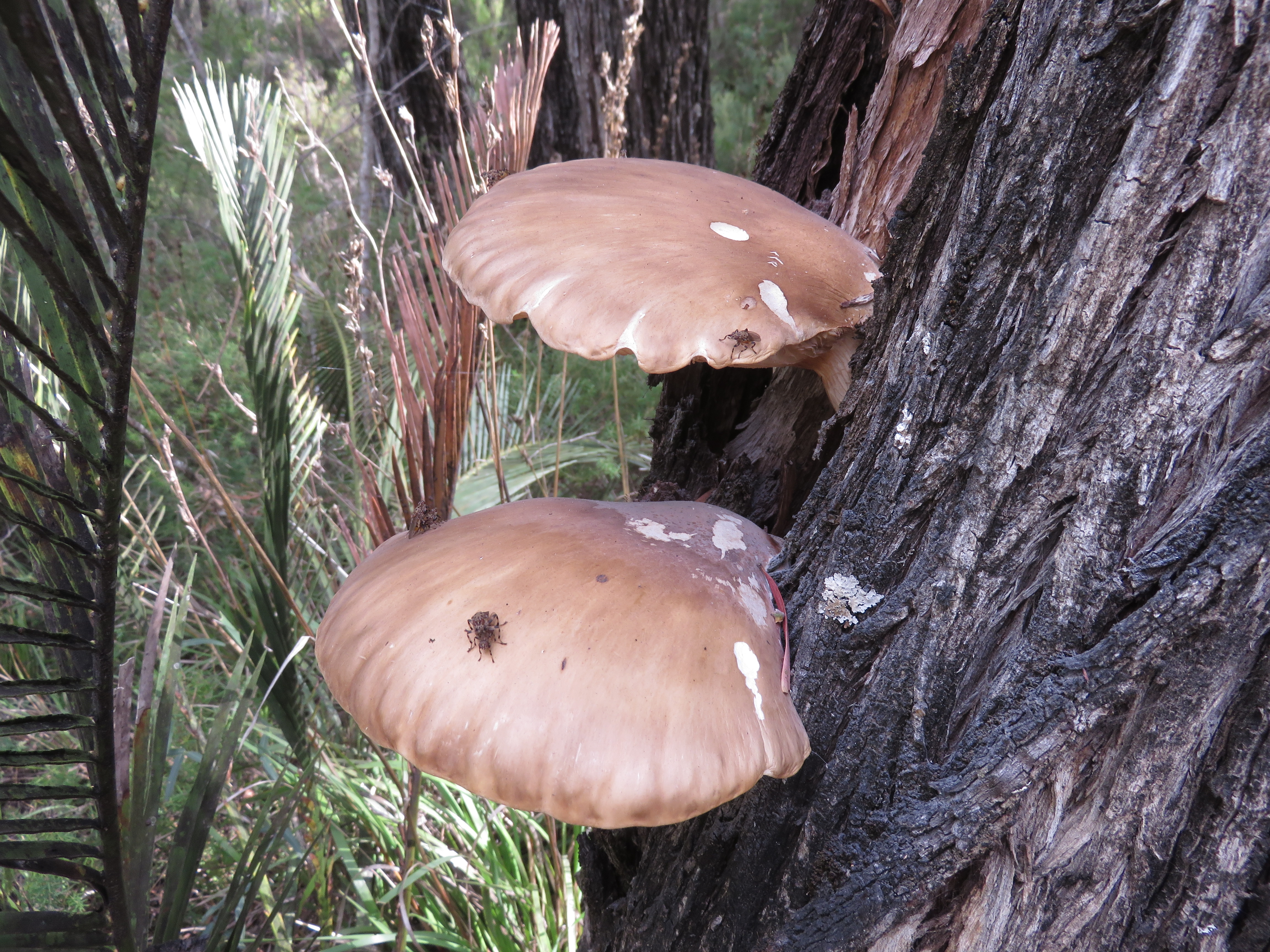
- Pleurotus australis (brown oyster mushroom) on peppermint tree, Callcup block, D'Entrecasteaux National Park, April 2017

Scientific classification
- Kingdom: Fungi
- Division: Basidiomycota
- Class: Agaricomycetes
- Order: Agaricales
- Family: Pleurotaceae
- Genus: Pleurotus
- Species: P. australis

Binomial name
- Pleurotus australis (Cooke & Massee) Sacc. (1891)

Synonyms
- Agaricus australis Cooke & Massee (1887); Dendrosarcus australis (Cooke & Massee) Kuntze (1898); Agaricus leptospermi F.Muell. (1888)

= Pleurotus australis =

Species of fungus

Pleurotus australis
- Mycological characteristics
- Gills on hymenium
- Cap is offset
- Hymenium is decurrent
- Stipe is bare or lacks a stipe
- Spore print is brown
- Ecology is saprotrophic
- Edibility is unknown

Pleurotus australis, the brown oyster mushroom, is a gilled fungus native to Australia and New Zealand. It is found on dead wood, particularly mānuka and ngāhere. Although morphologically similar to some other Pleurotus fungi, it has been shown to be a distinct species incapable of cross-breeding.

== See also ==
- List of Pleurotus species
