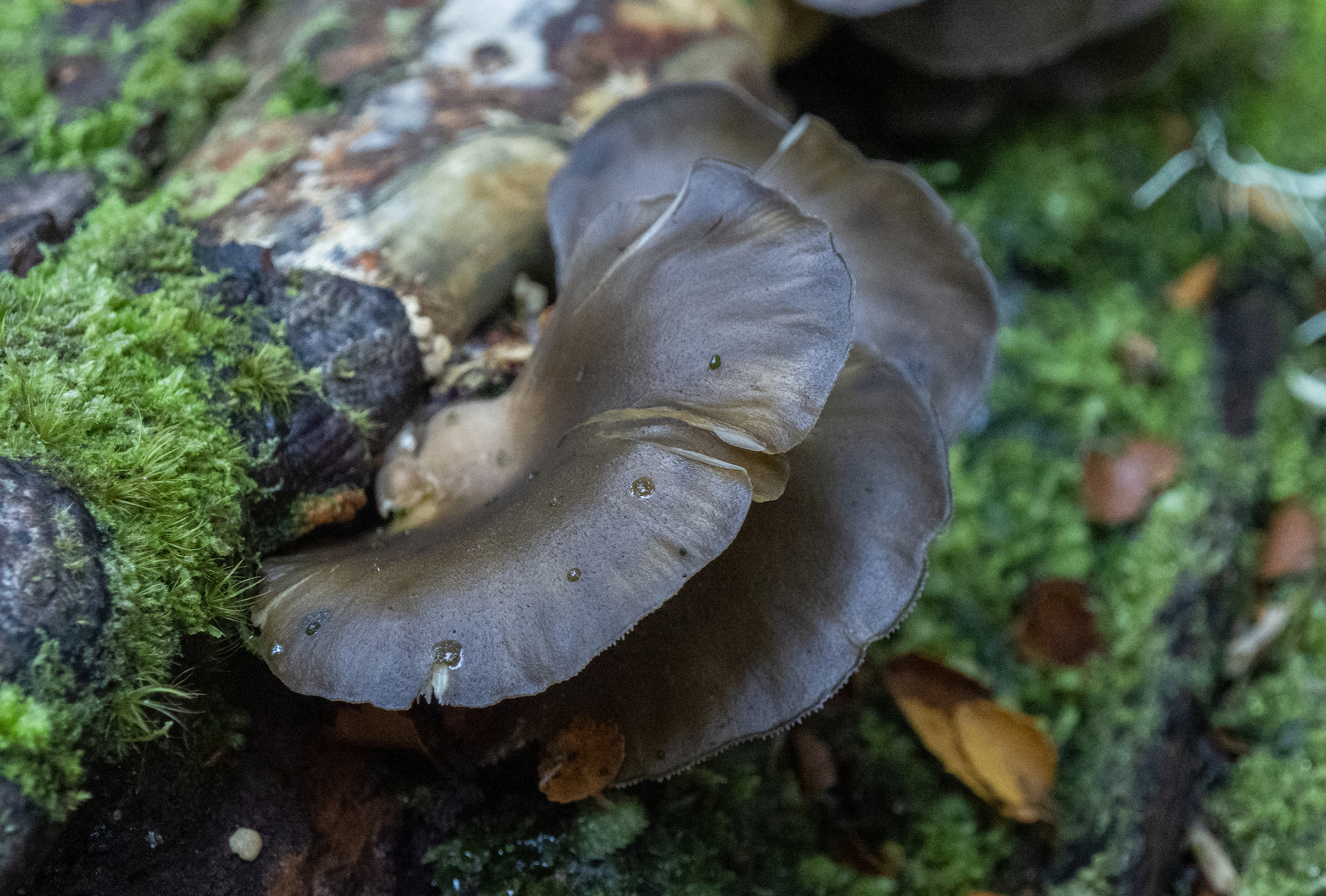

Scientific classification
- Kingdom: Fungi
- Division: Basidiomycota
- Class: Agaricomycetes
- Order: Agaricales
- Family: Pleurotaceae
- Genus: Pleurotus
- Species: P. purpureo-olivaceus

Binomial name
- Pleurotus purpureo-olivaceus (G.Stev.) Segedin, P.K.Buchanan & J.P.Wilkie (1995)

Synonyms
- Resupinatus purpureo-olivaceus G.Stev. (1964); Pleurotus rattenburyi Segedin (1984)

= Pleurotus purpureo-olivaceus =

Species of fungus

Pleurotus purpureo-olivaceus is a gilled fungus native to Australia and New Zealand. It is found on dead wood of Nothofagus trees. Although morphologically similar to some other Pleurotus fungi, it has been shown to be a distinct species incapable of cross-breeding and phylogenetically removed from other species of Pleurotus.

The caps of the fruit bodies are up to 7 cm (2.8 in) wide, and are dark violet to brown to olive to yellow-green, depending on light exposure. Stipes are lateral and white to yellow.
