= Clamp connection =

Fungal structure

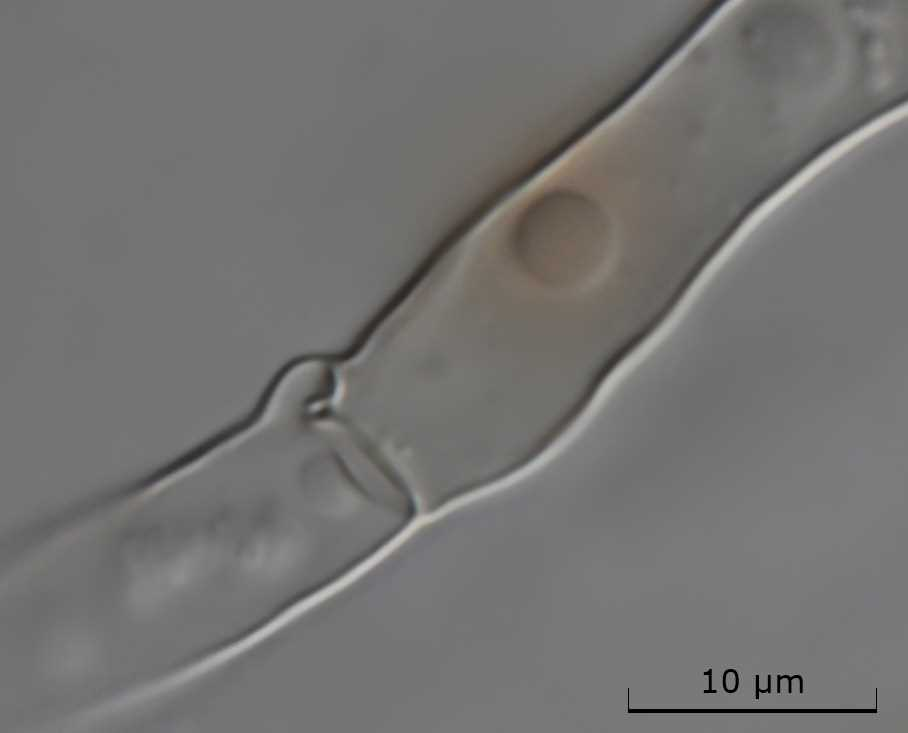
A Gymnopilus clamp connection

A clamp connection is a hook-like structure formed by growing hyphal cells of certain fungi. It is a characteristic feature of basidiomycete fungi. It is created to ensure that each cell, or segment of hypha separated by septa (cross walls), receives a set of differing nuclei, which are obtained through mating of hyphae of differing sexual types. It is used to maintain genetic variation within the hypha much like the mechanisms found in croziers (hooks) during the sexual reproduction of ascomycetes.

== Formation ==
Clamp connections in Mitosis

Clamp connection formation between two nuclei (one shown in green, the other orange)

Clamp connections are formed by the terminal hypha during elongation. Before the clamp connection is formed this terminal segment contains two nuclei. Once the terminal segment is long enough it begins to form the clamp connection. At the same time, each nucleus undergoes mitotic division to produce two daughter nuclei. As the clamp continues to develop it uptakes one of the daughter (green circle) nuclei and separates it from its sister nucleus. While this is occurring the remaining nuclei (orange circles) begin to migrate from one another to opposite ends of the cell. Once all these steps have occurred a septum forms, separating each set of nuclei.

== Use in classification ==
Clamp connections are structures unique to the phylum Basidiomycota. Many fungi from this phylum produce spores in basidiocarps (fruiting bodies, or mushrooms), above ground. Though clamp connections are exclusive to this phylum, not all species of Basidiomycota possess these structures. As such, the presence or absences of clamp connections has been a tool in categorizing genera and species.

== Fossil record ==
A fungal mycelium containing abundant clamp connections was found that dated to the Pennsylvanian era (298.9–323.2 Mya). This fossil, classified in the form genus Palaeancistrus, has hyphae that compare with extant saprophytic basidiomycetes. The oldest known clamp connections exist in fossilized hyphae growing in the fossil fern Botryopteris antiqua, which predate Palaeancistrus by about 25 Ma.
