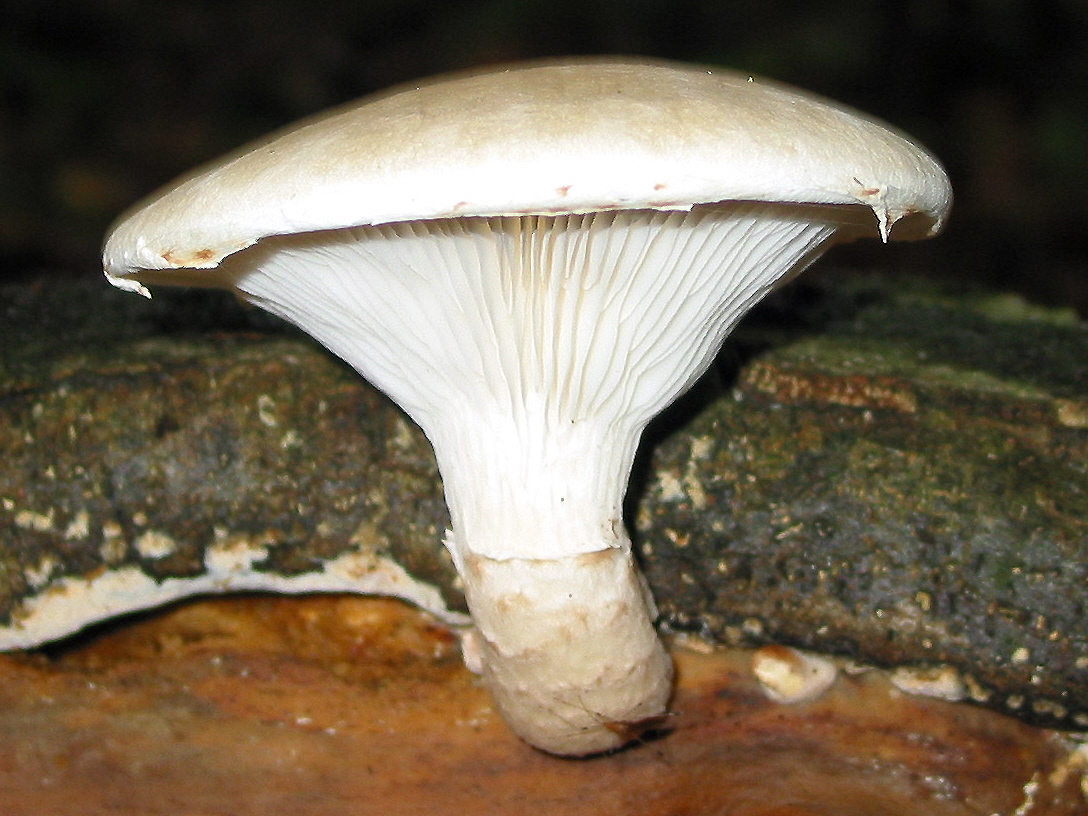

Scientific classification
- Kingdom: Fungi
- Division: Basidiomycota
- Class: Agaricomycetes
- Order: Agaricales
- Family: Pleurotaceae
- Genus: Pleurotus
- Species: P. dryinus

Binomial name
- Pleurotus dryinus (Pers.) P.Kumm. (1871)

Synonyms
- Agaricus acerinus Agaricus corticatus Agaricus dryinus Agaricus spongiosus Lentinus integer Lentinus underwoodii Pleurotus acerinus Pleurotus albertinii Pleurotus corticatus Pleurotus corticatus subsp. tephrotrichus Pleurotus corticatus var. albertinii Pleurotus corticatus var. tephrotrichus Pleurotus spongiosus Pleurotus tephrotrichus

= Pleurotus dryinus =

Species of fungus

Pleurotus dryinus
- Mycological characteristics
- Gills on hymenium
- Cap is offset
- Hymenium is decurrent
- Stipe has a ring
- Spore print is white
- Ecology is saprotrophic or parasitic
- Edibility is edible

Pleurotus dryinus, commonly known as the veiled oyster mushroom, is a species of fungus in the family Pleurotaceae. It grows on dead wood and is a weak pathogen, especially infecting broad-leaved trees.

== Taxonomy ==
The original definition of this fungus as Agaricus dryinus was made by Christian Hendrik Persoon in 1800. In 1871, Paul Kummer introduced Pleurotus as a genus and defined three similar ringed species: Pleurotus corticatus, Pleurotus albertini and P. dryinus. They were distinguished because only P. corticatus has intertwined ("anastomosing") gills on the stem and P. albertini is bigger and grows on conifer wood rather than oak. All three are now considered to be forms of the same species. The name dryinus takes precedence because it is the oldest.

Also, in 1874 Elias Magnus Fries defined a species as Pleurotus tephrotrichus, which has a deeper grey colour. This has also been incorporated into P. dryinus but may be distinguished as the variety tephrotrichus.

=== Etymology ===
The species name is a Latinised version of the Greek word "dryinos" (δρύῐνος), meaning "related to oak", referring to one of its main hosts.

== Description ==
The cap grows to 20 centimetres (8 in) across. It is pale to beige, but can turn yellowish. Veil remnants may adhere to the edge. At first it is velvety (tomentose) and the tomentum can develop into grey-brown scales; in old specimens the surface becomes bare and may crack.

The whitish or pale brownish lateral stem may be very short or up to 10 cm long, generally with a membranous ring.

The gills are decurrent well down the stipe and may anastomose (criss-cross) at the lower extreme. They are white, sometimes turning yellowish.

The smell is described as "pleasant" or "slightly polypore-like" or "complex, a bit fruity or sourish". The taste is mild.

=== Microscopic characteristics ===
As with ordinary fragile mushrooms, the flesh may be monomitic but may be dimitic, having extra thick-walled hyphae which give the flesh a tough consistency. There are no cystidia.

The spores are elongated in the form of a rounded cylinder and around 9–15 μm by 3–5 μm.

=== Similar taxa ===
Designation, author & date of related taxa	Relationship & status	Characteristics
Hypsizygus ulmarius (Bull.) Gray (1821)	This mushroom, which has been classified as a Pleurotus, is easy to mistake for P. dryinus.	The gills are only slightly decurrent, with no ring.
Lentinus levis (Berk. & M.A. Curtis) Murrill (1915)	This American mushroom, which has been classified as a Pleurotus, is easy to mistake for P. dryinus.	It has no cap scales, ring, or veil remnants, and the felty surface is different.
Pleurotus albertinii [Fr.) Sacc. (1887)	Once defined as a separate species, now part of P. dryinus	Larger than var. dryinus and grows on conifer, not deciduous wood
Pleurotus calyptratus (Lindblad ex Fr.) Sacc. (1887)	A similar but currently valid species, also with prominent veil remnants	Smells of flour, little or no stipe, cap smooth, only on poplar
Pleurotus corticatus (Fr.) P. Kumm. (1871)	Once defined as a separate species, now part of P. dryinus, may be considered a variety	Has intertwined ("anastomosing") gills on the stem
Pleurotus dryinus var. dryinus P. Kumm (1871)	Distinguishes general P. dryinus from varieties
Pleurotus dryinus var. tephrotrichus (Fr.) Damblon & Lambinon (1959)	Once defined as a separate species, now part of P. dryinus, may be considered a variety	Greyer than var. dryinus.

== Distribution and habitat ==
Appearing from summer to autumn, it is distributed throughout Europe, where it varies locally between common and rare. It is also found in North America.

This mushroom is saprobic on dead wood and can also be a weak parasite of trees (as a "white rot"). It occurs especially on oak (from which it derives its name), but also on beech, other broad-leaved trees, and occasionally on conifers. It is often solitary or may grow in small groups.

== Uses ==
This mushroom is edible, though it is tough when older and inferior to the better-known members of Pleurotus.

Like some other Pleurotus species, P. dryinus attacks nematodes and may provide a control method for these parasites when they infect cats and dogs.
