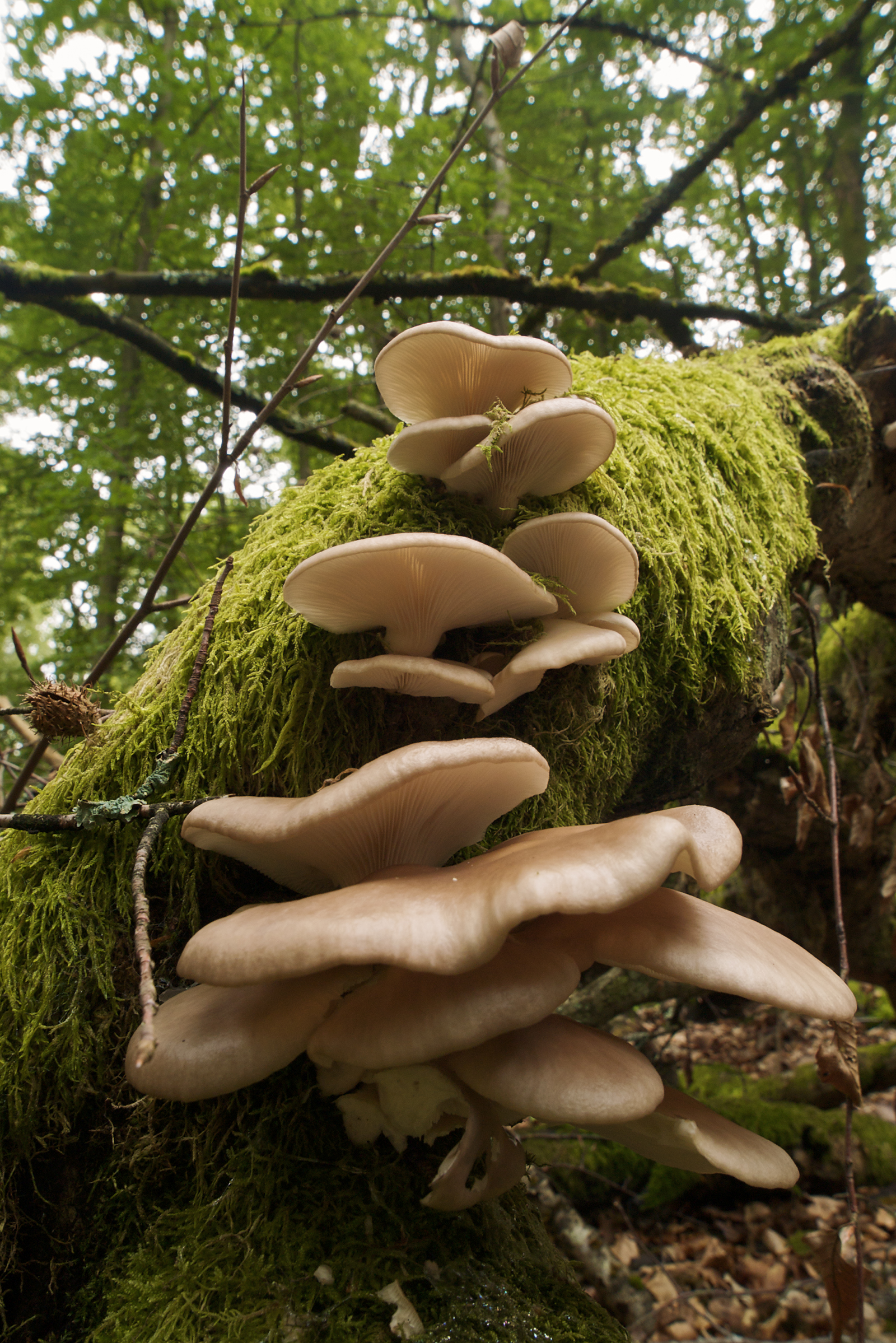

Scientific classification
- Kingdom: Fungi
- Division: Basidiomycota
- Class: Agaricomycetes
- Order: Agaricales
- Family: Pleurotaceae
- Genus: Pleurotus
- Species: P. pulmonarius

Binomial name
- Pleurotus pulmonarius (Fr.) Quél. (1872)

= Pleurotus pulmonarius =

Species of fungus

Pleurotus pulmonarius
- Mycological characteristics
- Gills on hymenium
- Cap is offset or convex
- Hymenium is decurrent
- Stipe is bare
- Spore print is white
- Ecology is saprotrophic
- Edibility is choice

Pleurotus pulmonarius, commonly known as the Indian oyster mushroom, Italian oyster mushroom, phoenix mushroom, or the lung oyster mushroom, is a species of fungus from family Pleurotaceae. This species has a close kinship with Pleurotus ostreatus, the pearl oyster.

== Description ==
- Pileus: 5 — 20+ cm, convex, becoming broadly convex to flat
- Gills: Whitish; decurrent if stipe is present; small beetles may be present
- Spore print: White, greyish, or lilac
- Stipe: If present, short and offset from the center of the cap; bald
- Microscopic features: Spores white to lavender-gray when dense, more or less cylindrical, 7.5–11 × 3–4 μm.
- Odour: Pleasant, like anise

== Taxonomy ==
This species was first published as Agaricus pulmonarius by Elias Magnus Fries in 1821. Lucien Quélet in 1872 reclassified this species as Pleurotus pulmonarius.

== Similar species ==
This species is very similar and has a close kinship to Pleurotus ostreatus, the pearl oyster, but with a few noticeable differences. The caps of P. pulmonarius are much paler and smaller than P. ostreatus and develop more of a stem. P. pulmonarius also prefers warmer weather than P. ostreatus and will appear later in the summer. The taste and cultivation of the two species is generally described as largely the same.

Another similar species, North America's Pleurotus populinus, is restricted to growing on aspen and cottonwood (genus Populus).

It may resemble a Clitocybe, some of which are poisonous, when growing on the top of wood.

Commercially available strains of this species are often labelled as "Pleurotus sajor-caju", which is a synonym of Lentinus sajor-caju. Lentinus sajor-caju has an annulus (ring) on the stipe while P. pulmonarius has a bare stipe. Secondly, L. sajor-caju is composed of trimitic or dimitic hyphae while P. pulmonarius is monomitic.

== Habitat ==
Pleurotus pulmonarius is widespread in temperate and subtropical forests throughout the world. In the eastern United States, this species is generally found on hardwoods while in the west it can also be found on conifers.

== Edibility and cultivation ==
This species is edible and is thus commercially cultivated. Pleurotus pulmonarius is a commonly cultivated oyster mushroom species in Europe and North America.

Pleurotus pulmonarius is commercially cultivated in New Zealand, sold as "Oyster mushrooms". The archetypal oyster mushroom, Pleurotus ostreatus, cannot be imported into New Zealand due to perceived risks to its forestry industry.

The cultivation of Pleurotus pulmonarius is very similar to how one would cultivate other types of Pleurotus species, like P. ostreatus, by transferring mycelium from a petri plate onto grain and then transferring the resulting "grain spawn" after the mycelium colonizes it to substrates of straw, wood chips, sawdust, cardboard, coffee grounds, and other cellulose-based substrates.

== Medical research ==
Several studies done on animals and in vitro suggest P. pulmonarius and its extracts may have medicinal applications for a wide range of conditions.

A polysaccharide called β-D-Glucan from P. pulmonarius reduces sensitivity to pain in mice and could be an "attractive" basis for new analgesic medications. In a different study on mice, a glucan from P. pulmonarius showed potent anti-inflammatory and analgesic properties. A methanol extract of P. pulmonarius displayed anti-inflammatory and antitumor activity comparable to the standard reference drugs diclofenac and cisplatin, respectively.

A 2010 study concluded that extracts of P. pulmonarius may slow the proliferation of cancer cells with high galectin-3 levels, while at the same time downregulate tumour cell adherence – which is directly related to the progression and spread of cancer. Extracts of P. pulmonarius added to the diet of mice delayed carcinogenesis, suggesting that these extracts may be useful as an adjuvant to cancer therapies.

An orally administered hot water extract of P. pulmonarius had a significant antihyperglycemic effect, halted the progression of diabetes, and reduced the mortality of alloxan induced diabetic mice by approximately 50%. It showed a synergistic effect with the antidiabetic drug glibenclamide, supporting the possibility of effective combination therapy of glibenclamide and P. pulmonarius for diabetes.

Pleurotus pulmonarius may be effective in the treatment of hay fever by inhibiting the release of histamine. Powdered P. pulmonarius mushrooms caused a significant reduction in sneezing and nasal rubbing when fed in water to sensitized mice, although the effect gradually builds up over a matter of weeks. When they were given 500 mg/kg a day, a significant effect was observed after two weeks, and it was four weeks before a significant change was observed at 200 mg/kg.

Extracts of P. pulmonarius attenuated the development of acute colitis in a mouse model, suggesting a possible clinical use in the treatment of colitis. A further study by the same authors concluded that the extracts also inhibit colon cancer formation associated with colitis in mice.

Extracts of P. pulmonarius have antimicrobial properties and exhibit antioxidant activity in vitro.

== See also ==
- List of Pleurotus species
