= C13H10N2 =

The molecular formula C_{13}H_{10}N_{2} may refer to:

- Aminoacridines
  - 2-Aminoacridine
  - 3-Aminoacridine
  - 4-Aminoacridine
  - 9-Aminoacridine
- Diazodiphenylmethane
