= Dacne quadrimaculata =

Scientific classification
- Kingdom: Animalia
- Phylum: Arthropoda
- Clade: Pancrustacea
- Class: Insecta
- Order: Coleoptera
- Suborder: Polyphaga
- Infraorder: Cucujiformia
- Family: Erotylidae
- Genus: Dacne
- Species: D. quadrimaculata

Binomial name
- Dacne quadrimaculata (Say, 1835)

Synonyms
- Ips quadrimaculata Say, 1835

Species of beetle

Dacne quadrimaculata is a tiny North American species of pleasing fungus beetle (family Erotylidae). It is placed in subfamily Dacninae, or – in taxonomic arrangements that prefer a more comprehensive subfamily Erotylinae – in tribe Dacnini of the Erotylinae.

This is one of the two Nearctic Dacne remaining in the genus, after most others have been split into distinct genera, the Beringian Xenodacne and the Neotropical Ameridacne. It occurs in the east and center of the continent, while the other species (D.californica) is found in the west. However, they do not seem to be sister species.

A COI phylogeny of 5 D.quadrimaculata and some of its closest relatives tentatively suggests that D.quadrimaculata is closer to the Eurasian D.rufifrons than to D.bipustulata (also from Eurasia), an undescribed French member of the genus, and D.picta from northeastern Asia. D.californica was not included in the study.

== Description ==
About 2.4-3.5 mm long and 1.1-1.7 mm wide as adults, this beetle is one of the smallest Erotylidae within its range. Pill-shaped and strongly shiny, the adults' coloration is brownish-black overall, with a round reddish spot near the base and another more elongated one at the tip of each elytron; these spots are the origin of its scientific name quadrimaculata, meaning "four-spotted" in Latin. The epistome, legs and antennae, and at least the tip and sides if not the entire abdomen are also reddish. After emerging from the pupa, these beetles are (as usual) lighter, and it seems that it takes rather long for this species' chitin to harden to its final dark color.

Like most of its close relatives, D.quadrimaculata has elytra which bear a mass of small pits vaguely arranged in lengthwise rows, and has a prothorax base that is almost as wide as the "shoulders"; unlike in the other "true" Dacne of North America, D.californica, the forward edge of its prothorax is considerably more narrow than the base however. Unlike in the beetles now moved out of Dacne, the forward margin of the pronotum bulges to form a "hood" which covers the base of the head up to the forward half of the compound eyes. Less unequivocal characters, which still denote many members of this genus but few other pleasing fungus beetles, are the evenly-scattered punctures on the pronotum, whose sides each feature a thin margin, a short-lined prosternum with an inconspicuous central plate, widely separated middle leg attachment points, and a straight border between meso- and metasternum. Its fourth tarsomere is not strongly reduced as in some other Erotylidae, and the end segment of its maxillary palps is cylindrical. The antennae have a more or less conspicuously asymmetrical rounded "club" at the tip, which is barely longer than wide.

Head
The compound eyes of D.quadrimaculata have small ommatidia, as is usually found in diurnal beetles. Males of this species have file-like structures on each side of the back of the neck which, when the beetle wiggles its head, rub against the chitin and produce a squeaking sound. Though present in many pleasing fungus beetles, in D.quadrimaculata these structures are expanded towards the top of the head, angling towards each other. Also, the head is strewn with smallish punctures at moderate density; like elsewhere on this beetle's body, these punctures bear a short inconspicuous bristle. The antennae consist of 11 segments; the third segment is elongated, the individual segments forming the club can be easily distinguished, and the "club" itself is strongly offset from the "stalk" of the antennae. As for the mouthparts, the mentum is wider than high, and the lacinia of the maxilla have two claw-like teeth at the outside, and two smaller and more strongly crooked spines on the inner side of their tip. The end segments of the maxillary palps are longer than wide.

Body, wings and legs
The pronotum is distinctly more narrow in front, where it also forms a pronounced bulge that covers the back of the head like a hood. In females, this is evenly curved, while in males it has a slight indentation in the center, forming a (not very conspicuously) two-lobed "hood". The outer sides of the pronotum are thickened and set-off from the main pronotal body, forming a beady rounded flange-like margin. The rear edge of the pronotum bulges backwards in the center and also has a margin, but it is very narrow; the front edge is unmargined. In the center of the pronotum there are smallish punctures like on the head; to the outsides, the punctures are slightly larger. On the prosternum, impressed lines run curve inward the rear to the foreleg coxae, and in some individuals a bit further forward and outward. The prosternal process between them is convex to the rear. The mesosternum is short and wide, its width between the mesocoxae at least half again as much as it is long, and it lacks coxal lines. On the metasternum the coxal lines are entirely missing, while those on the abdomen are vestigial and slightly tapering towards the front.

The elytra have a distinct albeit narrow margin along the entire base; they are covered in smallish punctures, with most strewn irregularly and less densely than on the head, and some arranged in vague lengthwise lines. On the legs' tarsi, the three basal segments are equally wide and have a few bristles on the underside, while the fourth segment is somewhat shorter than the third, but not altered otherwise and fully functional. The last (fifth) segment bears two strong claws.

Genitalia
The male genitalia of D.quadrimaculata have a trough-shaped membranous tegmen, concave from below and lightly sclerotized on the sides between two dorsal and two lateral struts; it ends in two lateral lobes. At the base of the dorsal struts, there are two wide plates which are slightly fused in the center and overlie the median lobe; two smaller sideward plates are further tipwards on the dorsal struts, at the bases of the lateral lobes. The lateral struts extend arm-like around the sides of the median lobe base; their bases, while adjacent to each other, are not joined. Near the base of the dorsal strut, there is an oblique seam in the lateral struts, and just beyond they expand towards the back and the base of the median lobe with a sharply cut-off flap. The lateral struts then continue on the lower side of the lateral lobes. The lateral lobes connect to the basal piece by a membrane, or directly where they are also adjacent to the lateral struts; they are moderately long, run adjacent at the upper midline, have bluntly rounded tips, and an indistinct row of small bristles on the lower sides. The median lobe is smoothly arcing, compressed, and strongly narrowed towards the tip, which is pointed on the underside. It is also slightly narrowed at its base near the median foramen. The rear two-thirds of its backside are membranous, with a large median orifice, and the underside is more strongly sclerotized. The median strut has a thicker proximal end; is half again as long as the median lobe, and narrowly and flexibly attached to the lobe's forward back above the median foramen. Seen from above or below, the median strut is narrow and has a lengthwise seam in the center. The well-developed internal sac is roughly as long as the median lobe and conspicuously inflated. At the proximal end it has a sclerotized and more or less expanded knob, to which the sac's retractor muscle attaches. Through this knob, the ejaculatory duct passes as a well-sclerotized tube which extends for some distance into the internal sac. Beyond that tube, unlike in many other "true" Dacne, the sclerotization does not continue. Notably, the free portion of the ejaculatory duct in the internal sac is much elongated, extending halfway to the median lobe's base.

The female genitalia of this species, like its closest relatives, have an unusual genital tube. The eighth tergite is membranous in front, sclerotized at the sides as well as on the rear, where it also has a row of small bristles. Similar bristles are found on the eighth sternite, which is fully sclerotized, with a strong rod extending from its central front for twice the sternite's length. Abdominal segment 9 is not sclerotized. It bears two lengthwise rows of tooth-like lamellae on the back, two on the belly, and two smaller ones on each side; these structures have been called "comb rows" by researchers. In this species, the smallest (side) rows have around 7 "teeth" each. The "teeth" point outward and forward and attach to a thickening of the segment's membrane. Between the teeth, the membrane carries tiny microscopic spikes, which are rooted through the membrane with a small bubble on the inside, all pointing into the same direction as the teeth. The teeth appear as if they were much larger aggregates of these spikes, with some intermediate-sized structures also present to form a somewhat fractal-like surface. While these structures are conspicuous (under a light microscope) and almost unique to this genus, their function is not clear. Their position changes depending on whether the genital tube is everted or retreated; in the latter case they might clasp the male genitals during copulation, while in the former they might hold open a tube bored into fungi when laying eggs. The ninth's segments appendages are limited to a simple coxite and a valvifer per side, but lack gonostyli. On the back between the valvifers there are two stiffening sclerotized lengthwise stripes called "paraprocts", which extend to form the tenth abdominal tergite with their fused widened and bluntly rounded rear ends; they are also known as "proctigeral lobes" or (more ambiguously) as "proctiger". On each upper-and underside of the valvifers, body wall folds form a baculum, to whose distal ends the gonocoxites attach; immediately below is the anus. The gonocoxites are markedly sclerotized into chisel-like structures; they can rotate in the horizontal around the bacula attachments, possibly forming a sort of ovipositor. On the ventral side of the vulva, there is a lobe-like extension at the margin of the genital aperture.

== Range and ecology ==
D.quadrimaculata is essentially restricted to North America east of the 100th meridian west. It is found from Nova Scotia and Québec in Canada and Maine in the USA west to Manitoba, and in the south from North Carolina to Nebraska and Texas. For unclear reasons, it seems to be scarce or entirely absent from Gulf of Mexico coast region.

In the north it ranges at least to Kentville, Nova Scotia, Casco, Maine, Potton Springs, Quebec, Ottawa, Ontario, and Winnipeg, Manitoba. Westward, it has been recorded at Itasca State Park in Minnesota, Child's Point bluff in Mount Vernon Gardens (13th Street, Omaha, Nebraska), in Topeka, Kansas, and Austin, Texas. The latter place is also one of its most southernly records, together with the settlement of Retreat at the lower West Fork Pigeon River, Haywood County, North Carolina, and Cheaha State Park in Alabama. The type specimen, like many beetles collected by Thomas Say, is probably lost; its type locality was not given more precisely than "North America".

Adults are most commonly encountered in the warm months; unlike many other pleasing fungus beetles which are conspicuously more common in the summer, D.quadrimaculata is regularly encountered from mid-April, such as on an April 18 in Toronto, Ontario, near the northeastern end of its range. At its southwestern limit, in Austin, Texas, it was even collected on a March 12. It is frequently encountered all the time through late September, but even from Toronto there is an October 17 record. From Lancaster, New York, there is an exceptional record from January, but with no information as to whether these beetles were found in hibernation.

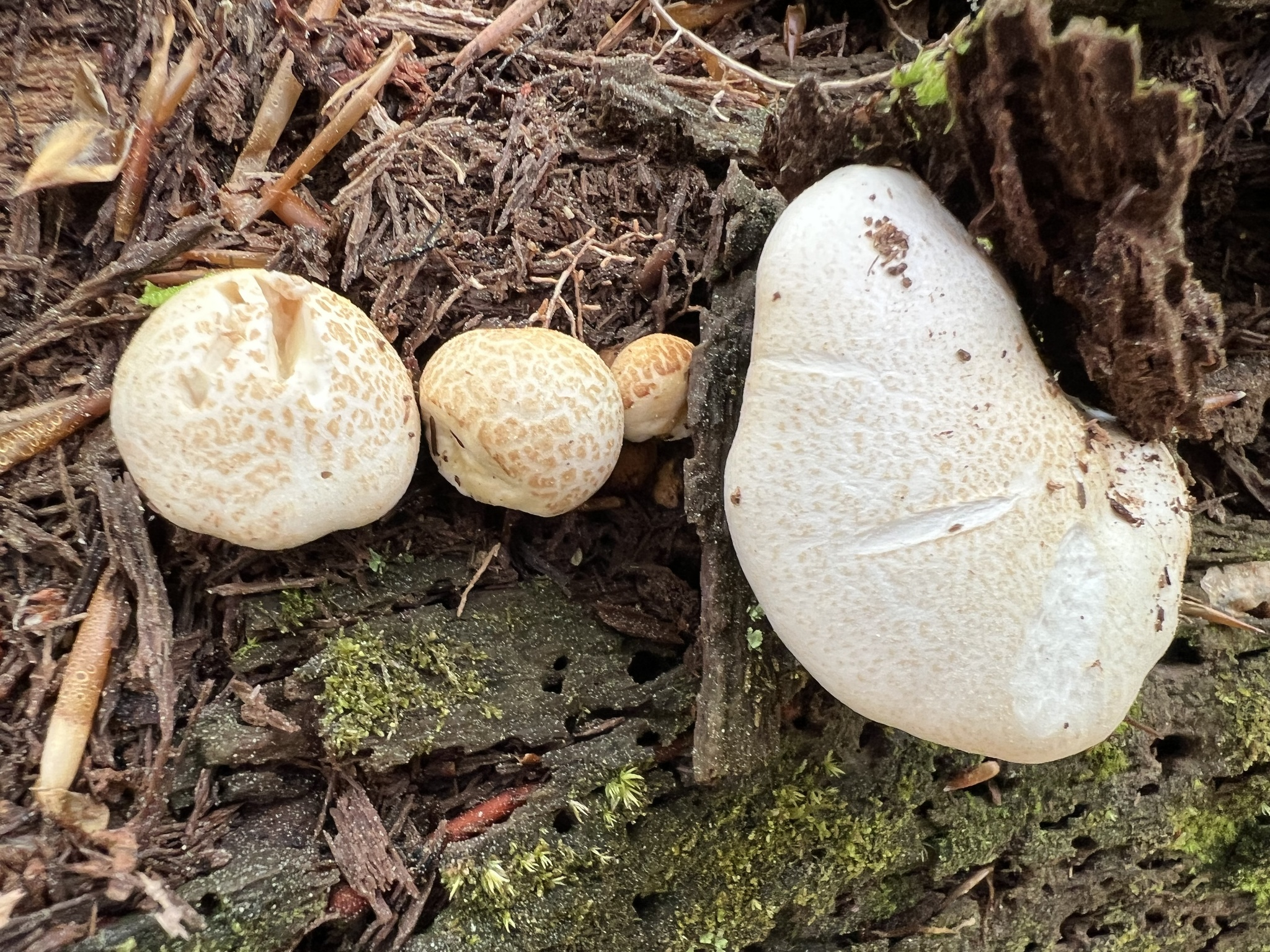
Scaly sawgill (Neolentinus lepideus) is occasionally eaten by adult D.quadrimaculata, but does not seem suitable food for its larvae (Bowie, Maryland)

This beetle eats fungi as larva and adults, with a preference for bracket fungi. It can occasionally be found on a wide range of fungus species from the orders Agaricales (e.g. Clavicorona of the Clavariaceae, Hypsizygus of the Lyophyllaceae, and Pluteus of the Pluteaceae), Polyporales (e.g. Piptoporus of the Fomitopsidaceae, Ganoderma of the Ganodermataceae, and perhaps Lentinus of the Polyporaceae), and – unusual for Erotylidae – Gloeophyllales (Neolentinus lepideus) and Russulales (Stereum of the Stereaceae). But even more than all these, adult D.quadrimaculata like to eat oyster mushrooms (Pleurotus; Agaricales: Pleurotaceae) such the common oyster mushroom (Pleurotus ostreatus), and the Polyporaceae Cerioporus squamosus (dryad's saddle). While P.ostreatus is confirmed as larval food of D.quadrimaculata, the larval biology itself is not well known.

On common oyster mushrooms, this species is sometimes found in mixed groups with the distantly related Erotylidae Triplax flavicollis and T.thoracica, which is unusual since pleasing fungus beetles usually associate only with their own species. Also, unlike D.quadrimaculata, these two Triplax species completely depend on P.ostreatus as food source even as adults; some resource partitioning mechanism to avoid competitive exclusion seems to be at work here.
