= C5H9NO2 =

The molecular formula C_{5}H_{9}NO_{2} (molar mass : 115.13 g/mol) may refer to:

- Allylglycine
- (+)-cis-2-Aminomethylcyclopropane carboxylic acid
- Dimethylaziridine carboxylic acid
- N-Formylmorpholine
- Proline, an amino acid
