= Pleurotus smithii =

Scientific classification
- Kingdom: Fungi
- Division: Basidiomycota
- Class: Agaricomycetes
- Order: Agaricales
- Family: Pleurotaceae
- Genus: Pleurotus
- Species: P. smithii

Binomial name
- Pleurotus smithii Guzmán, 1975

Species of fungus

Pleurotus smithii is a species of fungus in the family Pleurotaceae, described as new to science by mycologist Gastón Guzmán in 1975. Like other species of the Pleurotus cystidiosus clade, it has an anamorphic form, named Antromycopsis guzmanii. P. smithii can be distinguished from P. cystidiosus by lack of pleurocystidia or them being only present in young stages as cystidioid elements, short hyphal segments of the conidiophores in the anamorph, and long subcylindrical cheilocystidia in the teleomorph form.

== See also ==
- List of Pleurotus species
