= Dacne californica =

Scientific classification
- Kingdom: Animalia
- Phylum: Arthropoda
- Clade: Pancrustacea
- Class: Insecta
- Order: Coleoptera
- Suborder: Polyphaga
- Infraorder: Cucujiformia
- Family: Erotylidae
- Genus: Dacne
- Species: D. californica

Binomial name
- Dacne californica (Horn, 1870)

Synonyms
- Dacne cephalotes Casey, 1916; Dacne elongata Casey, 1916; Dacne laticollis Casey, 1916; Dacne uteana Casey, 1916; Engis californica Horn, 1870

Species of beetle

Dacne californica is a tiny American species of pleasing fungus beetle (family Erotylidae). It is placed in subfamily Dacninae, or – in taxonomic arrangements that prefer a more comprehensive subfamily Erotylinae – in tribe Dacnini of the Erotylinae.

This is one of the two Nearctic Dacne remaining in the genus, after most others have been split into distinct genera, the Beringian Xenodacne and the Neotropical Ameridacne. It occurs in the southwest of the continent, while the other species is found in the east and center. However, they do not seem to be sister species.

== Description ==
About 2-3.5 mm long and 0.9-1.5 mm wide as adults, this beetle is among the smallest Erotylidae within its range. Pill-shaped and slightly shiny, the adults' coloration is reddish-brown to brownish-black overall, with a round reddish spot near the base each elytron; while the tips of the elytra shade to red, this coloration usually does not form distinct spots. The upperside of the head and pronotum, the legs and the antennae are also reddish. After emerging from the pupa, these beetles are entirely yellow. On the other hand, occasionally specimens are found which are almost black and more shiny than usual, rarely even with indistinct yellow spots on the elytra tips; these are suspected to be very old individuals in which the hair and even the outer layer of the carapace are worn down and smoothed.

Like most of its close relatives, D.californica has elytra which bear a mass of small pits vaguely arranged in lengthwise rows, and has a prothorax base that is about as wide as the "shoulders"; unlike in the other "true" Dacne of North America, D.quadrimaculata, the pronotum is usually (but see below) almost rectangular. Unlike in the beetles now moved out of Dacne, the forward margin of the pronotum bulges to form a "hood" which covers the base of the head up to the forward half of the compound eyes. Less unequivocal characters, which still denote many members of this genus but few other pleasing fungus beetles, are the evenly-scattered punctures on the pronotum, whose sides each feature a thin margin, a short-lined prosternum with an inconspicuous central plate, widely separated middle leg attachment points, and a straight border between meso- and metasternum. Its fourth tarsomere is not strongly reduced as in some other Erotylidae, and the end segment of its maxillary palps is cylindrical. The antennae have a symmetrical rounded "club" at the tip, which is distinctly longer than wide.

The compound eyes of D.californica have small ommatidia, as is usually found in diurnal beetles. Males of this species have file-like structures on each side of the back of the neck which, when the beetle wiggles its head, rub against the chitin and produce a squeaking sound. Though present in many pleasing fungus beetles, in D.quadrimaculata these structures are expanded towards the top of the head, angling towards each other. Also, the head is strewn with smallish punctures at moderate density; like elsewhere on this beetle's body, these punctures bear a thin protruding bristle. As for the mouthparts, the mentum is wider than high, and the lacinia of the maxilla have two claw-like teeth at the outside, and two smaller and more strongly crooked spines on the inner side of their tip. The end segments of the maxillary palps are longer than wide.

The pronotum forms a pronounced bulge in front that covers the back of the head like a hood. In females, this is evenly curved, while in males it has a slight indentation in the center, forming a (not very conspicuously) two-lobed "hood". The outer sides of the pronotum are thickened and set-off from the main pronotal body, forming a beady rounded flange-like margin. The rear edge of the pronotum also has a margin, but it is very narrow; the front edge is unmargined. The overall shape of the pronotum varies widely in this species; in some individuals it is narrow and trapezoidal, with the rear edge not quite as wide as the wing base, and the forward edge of the pronotum even more narrow, resembling the situation in D.quadrimaculata. On the other extreme, the pronotum rear may be slightly wider than the wings, and the front about as wide, resulting in a wider and almost rectangular form. In 1916, Thomas Casey Jr. studied a set of nine specimens of this beetle, which happened to encompass the entire range of variation in pronotum shape and size, and described four supposedly new species from these. But comparison of some 700 specimens from across the species' range showed no difference in their genitalia from "typical" D.californica. Moreover, there was no discernible pattern in locality or altitude affiliated with a particular pronotum shape or size, and large and wide pronota could be found in small beetles, as well as small pronota in large ones, and vice versa. The supposed "species" are thus only forms with no taxonomic standing.

In the center of the pronotum there are smallish punctures like on the head; to the outsides, the punctures are slightly larger. On the prosternum, impressed lines run curve inward the rear to the foreleg coxae, and in some individuals a bit further forward and outward. The prosternal process between them is convex to the rear. The mesosternum is short and wide, its width between the mesocoxae at least half again as much as it is long, and it lacks coxal lines. On the metasternum the coxal lines are entirely missing, while those on the abdomen are vestigial and slightly tapering towards the front. The elytra have a distinct albeit narrow border at the base; they are covered in smallish punctures, with most strewn irregularly and less densely than on the head, and some arranged in vague lengthwise lines. On the legs' tarsi, the three basal segments have a few bristles on the underside, while the fourth segment is somewhat shorter than the third, but not altered otherwise and fully functional. The last (fifth) segment bears two strong claws.

The male genitalia of D.quadrimaculata have a trough-shaped membranous tegmen, concave from below and lightly sclerotized on the sides between two dorsal and two lateral struts; it ends in two lateral lobes. At the base of the dorsal struts, there are two wide plates which are slightly fused in the center and overlie the median lobe; two smaller sideward plates are further tipwards on the dorsal struts, at the bases of the lateral lobes. The lateral struts extend arm-like around the sides of the median lobe base; their bases, while adjacent to each other, are not joined. Near the base of the dorsal strut, there is an oblique seam in the lateral struts, and just beyond they expand towards the back and the base of the median lobe with a sharply cut-off flap. The lateral struts then continue on the lower side of the lateral lobes. The lateral lobes connect to the basal piece by a membrane, or directly where they are also adjacent to the lateral struts; they are moderately long, run adjacent at the upper midline, and have a conspicuous row of small bristles on the lower sides. Their tips are pointed, with a small nipple surrounded by a few bristles at their outer side. The median lobe is smoothly arcing, compressed, and strongly narrowed towards the tip, which is pointed on the underside. It is also slightly narrowed at its base near the median foramen. The rear two-thirds of its backside are membranous, with a large median orifice, and the underside is more strongly sclerotized. The median strut has a thicker proximal end; is half again as long as the median lobe, and narrowly and flexibly attached to the lobe's forward back above the median foramen. Seen from above or below, the median strut is narrow and has a lengthwise seam in the center. The well-developed internal sac is roughly as long as the median lobe, conspicuously inflated, and on its underside has two bow-shaped sclerotizations. At the proximal end it has a sclerotized and more or less expanded knob, to which the sac's retractor muscle attaches. Through this knob, the ejaculatory duct passes as a well-sclerotized tube which extends for some distance into the internal sac. Beyond that tube, the free portion of the ejaculatory duct in the internal sac is shortened, ending just as it reaches the bow-shaped sclerites. These, if seen from the side, seem to continue the ejaculatory duct almost to the median lobe's base.

The female genitalia of this species, like its closest relatives, have an unusual genital tube. The eighth tergite is membranous in front, sclerotized at the sides as well as on the rear, where it also has a row of small bristles. Similar bristles are found on the eighth sternite, which is fully sclerotized, with a strong rod extending from its central front for twice the sternite's length. Abdominal segment 9 is not sclerotized. It bears two lengthwise rows of tooth-like lamellae on the back, two on the belly, and two smaller ones on each side; these structures have been called "comb rows" by researchers. In this species, the smallest (side) rows have around 5 "teeth" each. The "teeth" point outward and forward and attach to a thickening of the segment's membrane. Between the teeth, the membrane carries tiny microscopic spikes, which are rooted through the membrane with a small bubble on the inside, all pointing into the same direction as the teeth. The teeth appear as if they were much larger aggregates of these spikes, with some intermediate-sized structures also present to form a somewhat fractal-like surface. While these structures are conspicuous (under a light microscope) and almost unique to this genus, their function is not clear. Their position changes depending on whether the genital tube is everted or retreated; in the latter case they might clasp the male genitals during copulation, while in the former they might hold open a tube bored into fungi when laying eggs. The ninth's segments appendages are limited to a simple coxite and a valvifer per side, but lack gonostyli. On the back between the valvifers there are two stiffening sclerotized lengthwise stripes called "paraprocts", which extend to form the tenth abdominal tergite with their fused widened and bluntly rounded rear ends; they are also known as "proctigeral lobes" or (more ambiguously) as "proctiger". On each upper-and underside of the valvifers, body wall folds form a baculum, to whose distal ends the gonocoxites attach; immediately below is the anus. The gonocoxites are markedly sclerotized into chisel-like structures; they can rotate in the horizontal around the bacula attachments, possibly forming a sort of ovipositor. On the ventral side of the vulva, there is a lobe-like extension at the margin of the genital aperture.

== Distribution ==
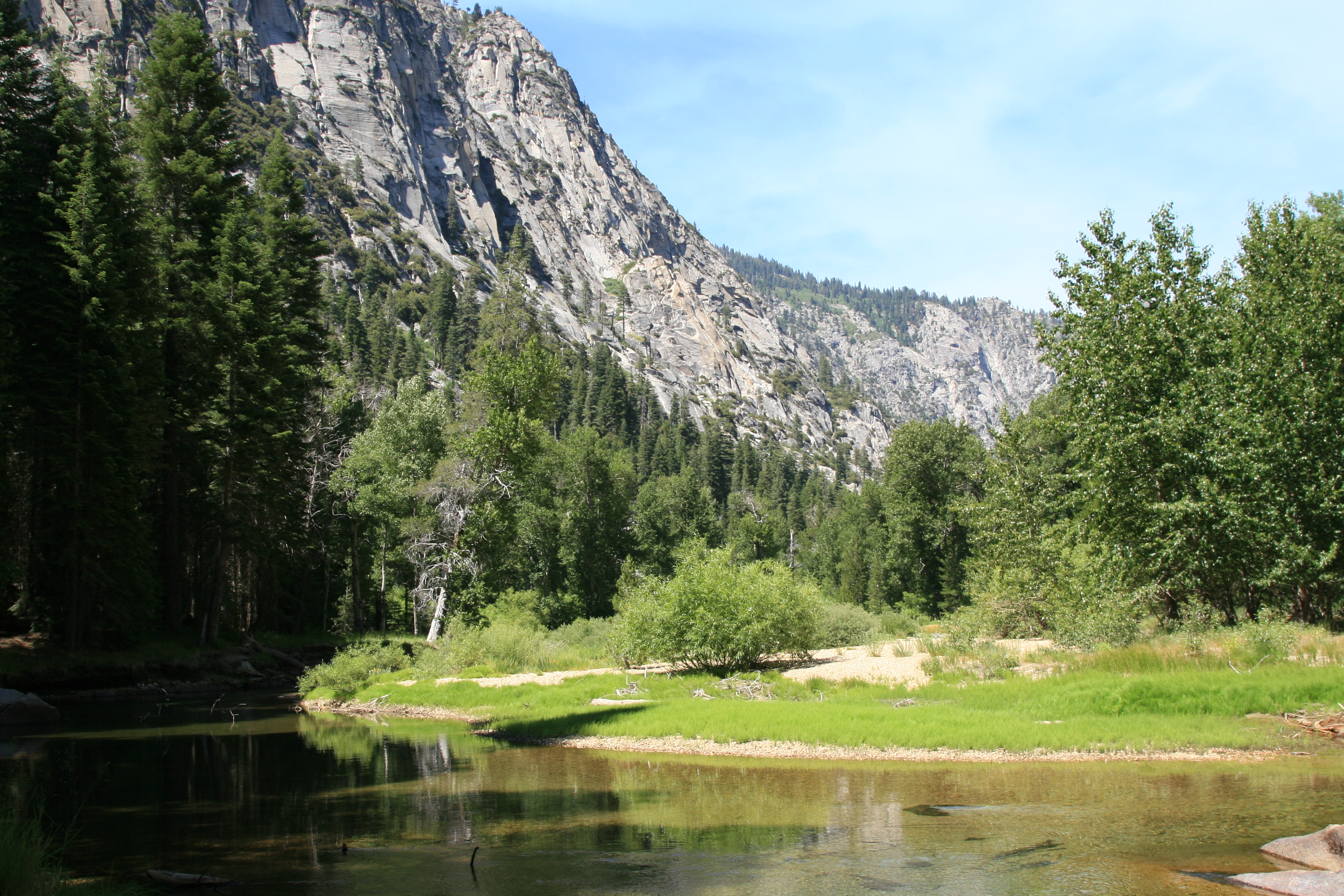
In Paradise Valley (Kings Canyon National Park, California), D.californica occurs near its altitude limit

D.californica is almost endemic to the US west of the Rocky Mountains, barely extending into southwesternmost Canada and northwesternmost Mexico. From British Columbia, it ranges to the northern Baja California peninsula, in the east to Idaho and Utah. It is mainly found in California, where it seems to be most abundant in the San Francisco Bay area, but can be met with all across the State. The northeasternmost extent of its range goes at least to the Monashee Mountains in British Columbia – Trinity Valley near Lumby, and Salmon Arm. Further south, it ranges eastwards at least to Coeur d'Alene, Lenore and Boise (all in Idaho), and Provo, Utah. How much its range extends into Mexico is not well understood; there is a record from "Baja California, 15 miles south of San Domingo" – presumably the Misión Santo Domingo de la Frontera (abandoned after 1821), which would place the locality just northeast of San Quintín, Baja California. This species is found from the coast up to at least 7000 ft (over 2,000 m) AMSL at least in California, where was reported from the Paradise Valley of Kings Canyon National Park and Fallen Leaf near Lake Tahoe; it also seems to be common in the Santa Cruz Mountains. In the north of its range, records are from lower altitudes as far as is known, around 1,000-1,600 ft (300-500 m).

There is some dispute about the type specimens: while an unsexed adult, number 3166 in the ANSP George Horn collection, is labeled "Lectotype", there is also the MCZ John LeConte collection specimen 8176, which is labeled "Type". The former has the locality "Cal.", the latter "Cala.", both indicating California as their origin. As per the original description by George Horn, his specimens (without indication how many these were, or designation of a particular one as holotype) were from Fort Crook in the north, Sacramento in the Central Valley, and Fort Tejon in the south.

There are also some disputed and probably misattributed specimens from further east in the USA. Two individuals with particularly wide pronotum (Casey's laticollis) are attributed to the Levette collection and claimed to be from Indiana. Collector J.O.Martin claimed to have taken two males and two females at McNeil, Texas on June 6, 1929; their genitalia refer them to D.californica. There is also a specimen claimed to be from "Crooked Creek" at "Wickham", inferred to be in Pennsylvania; this ambiguous name is said to refer to the eastern of the "Crooked Creeks" of Pennsylvania, i.e. a locality in Tioga County, most likely in Chatham or Middlebury Townships. All these and additional records outside its main range – e.g. in Texas – are spurious and most likely refer to misidentifications, mislabelled specimens, or introductions by humans.

== Ecology ==
Unlike many other pleasing fungus beetles which are conspicuously more common in the summer, D.californica records are more evenly distributed over the year. While it is generally found from early May to September even in Salmon Arm in the very north of its range, and in the south probably to early October, the record from Lenore is from a March 8, and it was found on a March 7 in Medford, Oregon, albeit possibly still hibernating. And while it was reported from California on a December 23 (Pasadena) and on a January 7 (Pacific Grove), as well as from Corvallis, Oregon, on a January 16, there is no information as to whether these beetles were found in hibernation.

It has been associated with particular tree species such as alder (Alnus), ponderosa pine (Pinus ponderosa), douglas-fir (Pseudotsuga menziesii); these are relevant to T.frosti not as the specific tree species in and by themselves, but as generic hideouts – and most of all as the hosts of the fungi on which this beetle feeds. Like related species, it probably has a preference for oyster mushrooms (Pleurotus; Agaricales: Pleurotaceae) as larvae and adults; namely, it was recorded on a common oyster mushroom (Pleurotus ostreatus) growing on an alder. Also, it was reported from a "Polyporus fungus" growing at Garland, Utah. This taxon is highly ambiguous; it was historically used for a lot of fungi primarily of family Polyporaceae of the Polyporales ("true" shelf fungi), and without corroborating information cannot be identified. This is all the more unfortunate, as D.californica larvae – otherwise almost undocumented – were successfully raised from this fungus, proving it to be suitable larval food. And while D.quadrimaculata adults are commonly found on dryad's saddle (formerly "Polyporus" squamosus), a widespread Polyporaceae, its suitability as larval food for this species is questionable at best. Horn's type specimens were partially collected from under bark, and the Medford record in early March was from a "wood-rat" nest (in Medford, Neotoma cinerea or Neotoma fuscipes) where they might have hibernated.
