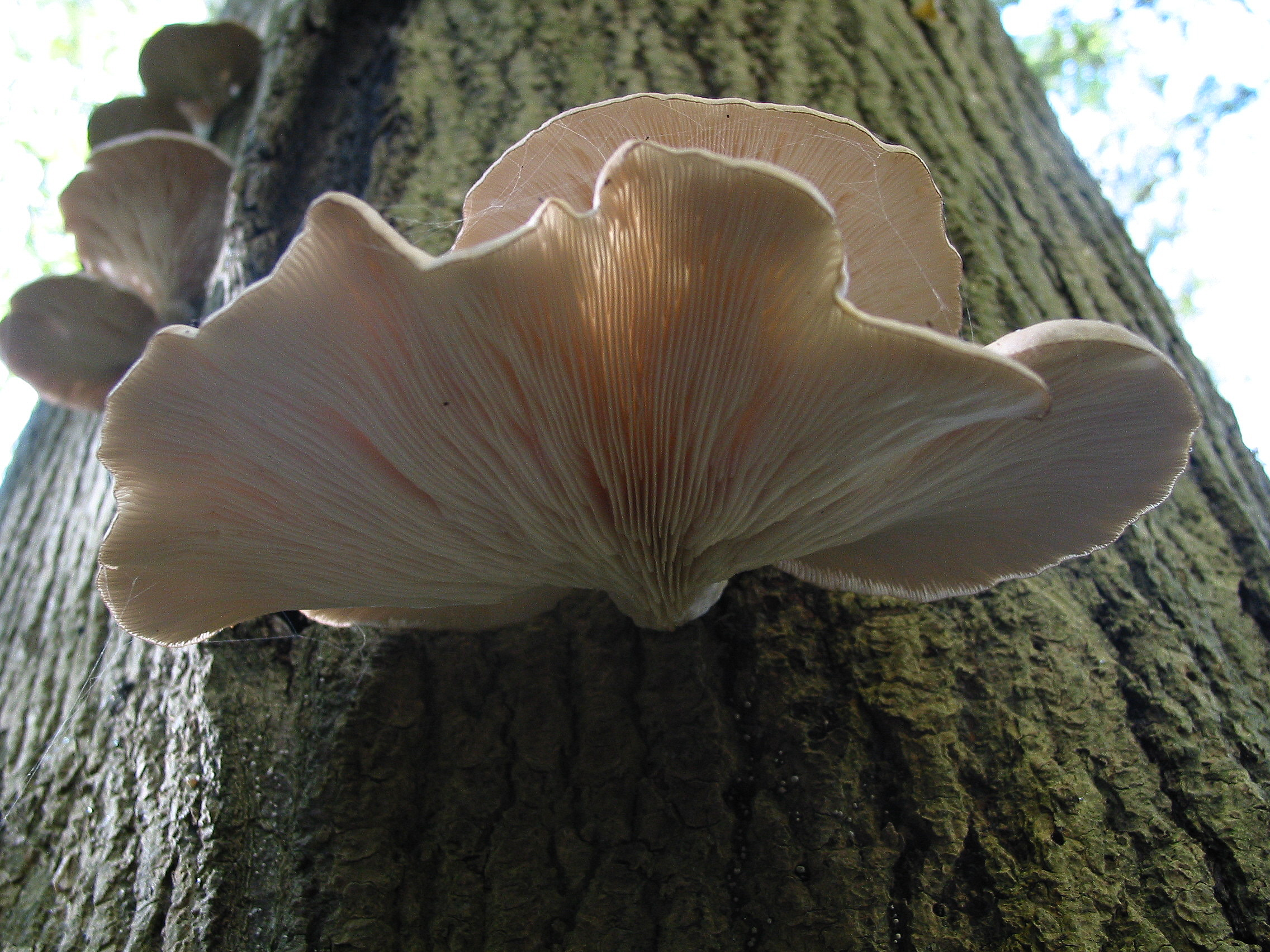

Scientific classification
- Kingdom: Fungi
- Division: Basidiomycota
- Class: Agaricomycetes
- Order: Agaricales
- Family: Pleurotaceae
- Genus: Pleurotus
- Species: P. ostreatus

Binomial name
- Pleurotus ostreatus (Jacq. ex Fr.) P.Kumm. (1871)

= Pleurotus ostreatus =

Species of fungus

Pleurotus ostreatus
- Mycological characteristics
- Gills on hymenium
- Cap is offset
- Hymenium is decurrent
- Stipe is bare
- Spore print is white
- Ecology is saprotrophic or parasitic
- Edibility is choice

Pleurotus ostreatus, commonly known as the oyster mushroom, grey oyster mushroom, oyster fungus, hiratake, or pearl oyster mushroom, is a popular edible mushroom found in temperate and subtropical forests around the world.

== Name ==
Both the Latin and common names refer to the shape of the fruiting body. The Latin pleurotus (side-ear) refers to the sideways growth of the stem with respect to the cap, while the Latin ostreatus (and the English common name, oyster) refers to the shape of the cap which resembles the bivalve of the same name. The oyster reference may also derive from the slippery texture of the mushroom.

== Description ==
The cap is broad, fan or oyster-shaped, and 2–30 centimetres (1–12 inches) wide. In the wild, it ranges from white to gray or brown; the margin is inrolled when young, smooth and often somewhat lobed or wavy. The flesh is white, firm, and varies in thickness due to stipe arrangement. The stipe, if present, is up to 4 cm (1 1/2 in) long and thick, off-center and attaching laterally to wood. The gills are whitish, sometimes becoming yellowish, and decurrent if a stalk is present. The spore print is white to lilac-gray, and best viewed on a dark background. The mushroom has the bittersweet aroma of benzaldehyde or bitter almonds.

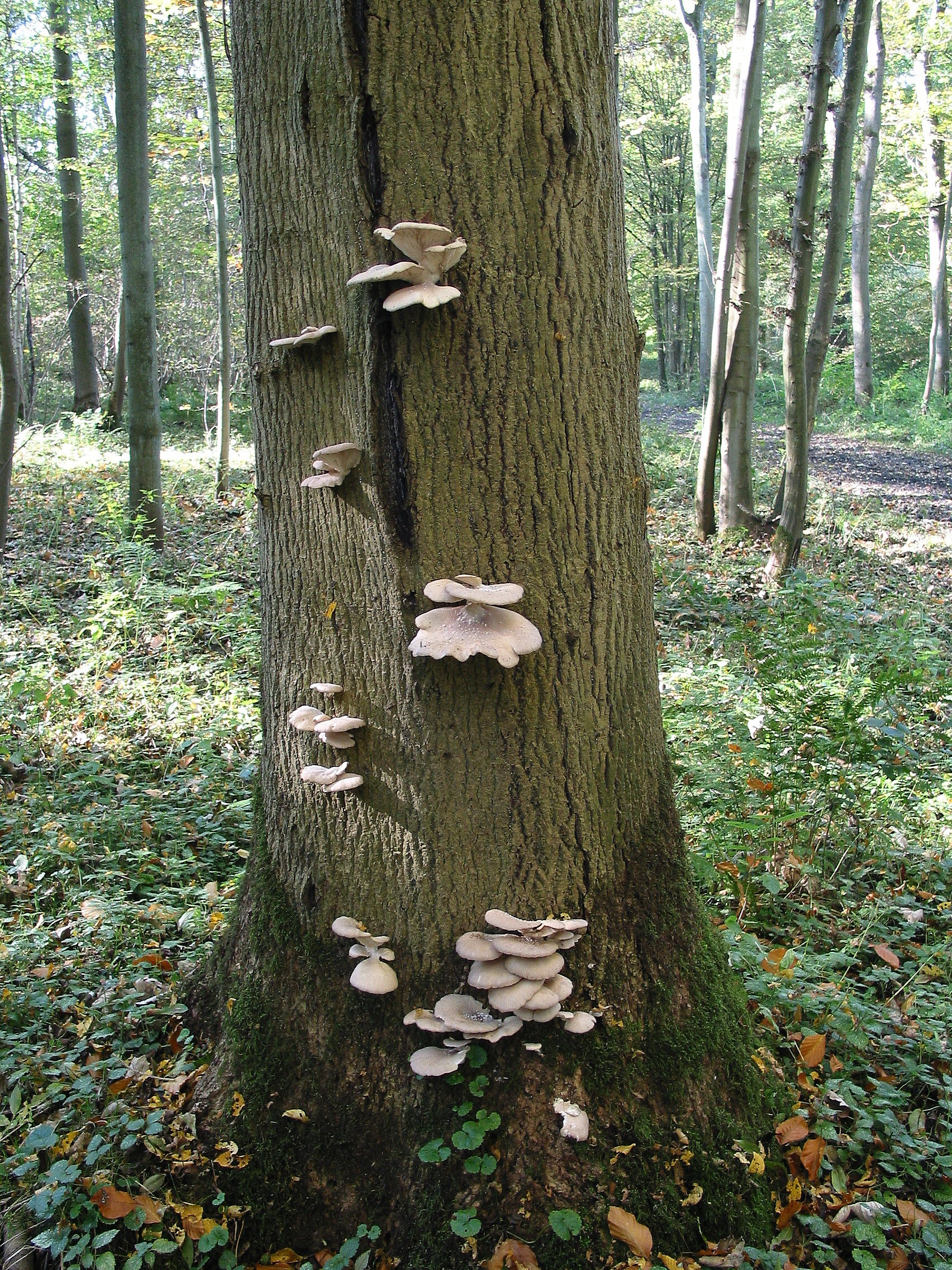
Oyster mushrooms on a tree

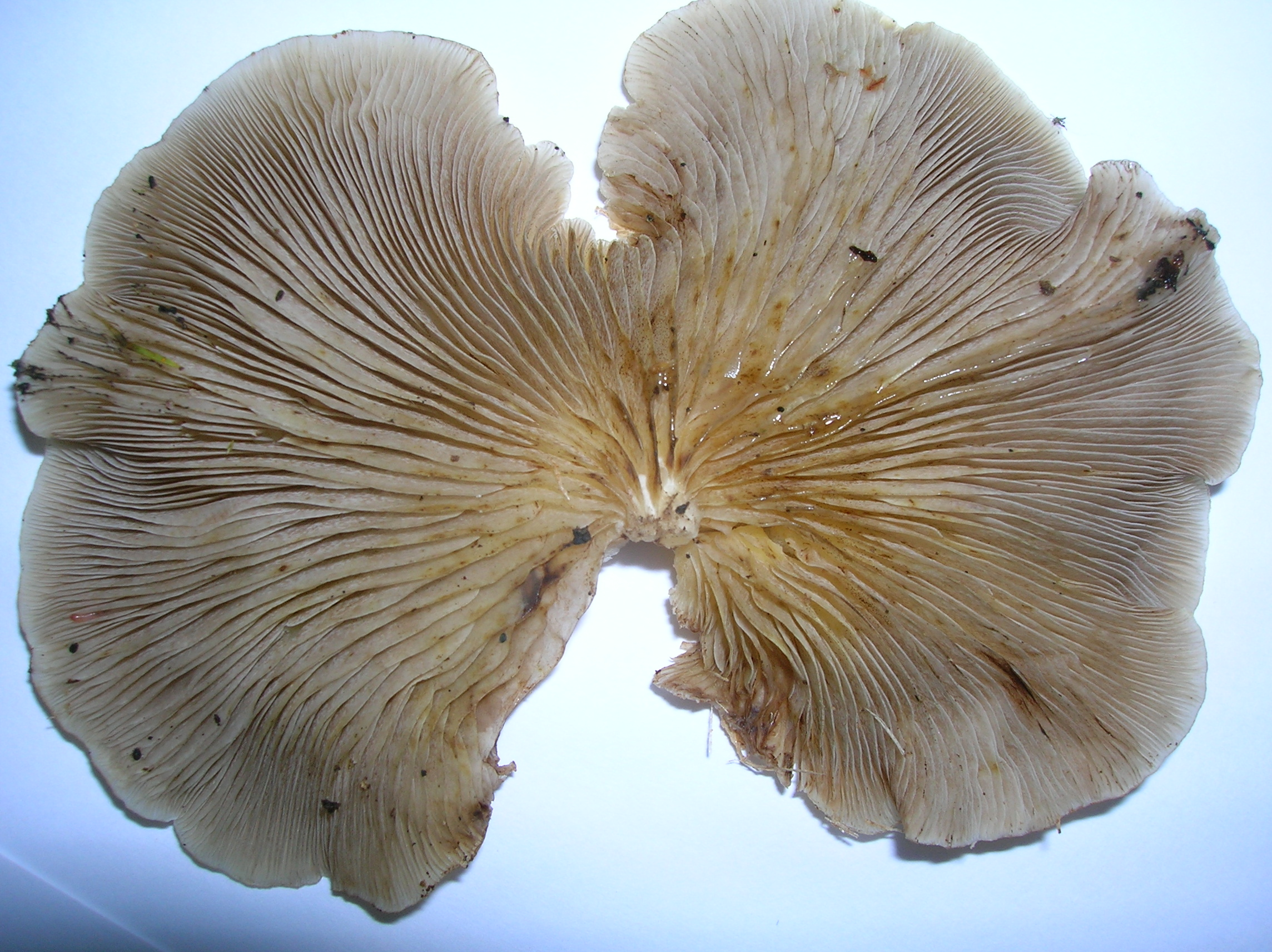
Details of the gill structure

=== Similar species ===
It is related to the similarly cultivated Pleurotus eryngii (king oyster mushroom). Other similar species include P. columbinus, P. cornucopiae, Hohenbuehelia petaloides, the hairy-capped Phyllotopsis nidulans, and the smaller Pleurocybella porrigens.

Omphalotus nidiformis is a toxic lookalike found in Australia. In North America, potential lookalikes include the toxic muscarine-containing O. olivascens (the western jack-o'-lantern mushroom) and Clitocybe dealbata (the ivory funnel mushroom). Some toxic Lentinellus species are similar in appearance, but have gills with jagged edges and finely haired caps.

== Distribution and habitat ==
The oyster mushroom is widespread in many temperate and subtropical forests throughout the world, although it is absent from the Pacific Northwest of North America, being replaced by P. pulmonarius and P. populinus. It is a saprotroph that acts as a primary decomposer of wood, especially deciduous trees, and beech trees in particular. It is a white-rot wood-decay fungus.

The oyster mushroom can be found in many habitats, year round in the United Kingdom, while some related species (e.g. the branched oyster mushroom) grow only on trees.

== Ecology ==
While this mushroom is often seen growing on dying hardwood trees, it appears to be saprophytic rather than parasitic. As the tree dies of other causes, P. ostreatus grows on the rapidly increasing mass of dead and dying wood. They actually benefit the forest by decomposing the dead wood, returning vital elements and minerals to the ecosystem in a form usable to other plants and organisms. Additionally, oyster mushrooms bioaccumulate lithium.

All major lineages of the oyster mushroom are carnivorous. The mushroom's mycelia can kill and digest nematodes, which is believed to be a way in which the mushroom obtains nitrogen. P. ostreatus is one of at least 700 known nematophagous mushrooms.

This species is a favorite or even exclusive food of many pleasing fungus beetles (family Erotylidae). Species recorded from P.ostreatus include Dacne californica, D.quadrimaculata, and especially the breast-plated triplax Triplax thoracica and its cryptic species complex, consisting of T.californica, T.cuneata, T.dissimulator, T.errans, T.flavicollis, T.frosti, T.lacensis, T.mesosternalis, T.microgaster, T.puncticeps and T.wehrlei. Most members of the species complex seem to require Pleurotus, and in some cases P.ostreatus specifically, as larval food.

== Uses ==
Commercial cultivation of this mushroom first began in Germany as a subsistence measure during World War I, and it is now grown commercially around the world for food.

=== Culinary ===
The oyster mushroom is a choice edible. Oyster mushrooms are used in Czech, Polish, and Slovak contemporary cuisine in soups and stews in a similar fashion to meat, as well as breaded to become a vegetarian alternative to the kotlet in Polish dishes. It is a delicacy in Japanese, Korean and Chinese cuisine. In Indonesia it is common to find street food vendors selling crispy deep fried oyster mushrooms. It is frequently served on its own, in soups, stuffed, or in stir-fry recipes with soy sauce. Oyster mushrooms may be used in sauces, such as vegetarian oyster sauce. The mushroom's taste has been described as mild with a slight odor similar to anise. It is best when picked young; as the mushroom ages, the flesh becomes tough and the flavor becomes acrid.

=== Other uses ===
The pearl oyster mushroom is also used to create mycelium bricks, mycelium furniture, and leather-like products.

Oyster mushrooms can also be used industrially for mycoremediation purposes. Oyster mushrooms were used to treat soil that had been polluted with diesel oil. The mushroom was able to convert 95% of the oil into non-toxic compounds. P. ostreatus is also capable of growing upon and degrading oxo-biodegradable plastic bags; it can also contribute to the degradation of renewable polyethylene.

The species has been found to contain the cholesterol-lowering drug lovastatin.

== See also ==
- List of Pleurotus species
