= Burnol =

Indian topical antiseptic cream

Burnol is a topical antiseptic cream marketed in India for minor burns, cuts, and wounds. It is currently owned and manufactured by Dr. Morepen, a division of Morepen Laboratories Ltd. Originally launched in the 1940s by Reckitt & Colman, Burnol became a household name across India. Its distinctive yellow-orange color and its association with burn injuries led to widespread recognition. Over time, it achieved a cult status, often referenced in Indian pop culture as a metaphor for coping with figurative “burns” or emotional setbacks.

== Composition ==
The cream contains aminacrine hydrochloride (0.1 g per 100 g) and cetrimide (0.5 g per 100 g) as active ingredients. Aminacrine serves as an antimicrobial agent, while cetrimide exhibits antiseptic and bactericidal properties effective against both gram-positive and gram-negative bacteria.

== Market history ==
Burnol was introduced in India in the 1940s by Reckitt & Colman, during the British colonial period, primarily for use as a first-aid antiseptic for minor burns and injuries.

In 2002, Reckitt Benckiser sold Burnol to Dr. Morepen, part of Morepen Laboratories Ltd, as part of a portfolio restructuring effort. Under Dr. Morepen, the product retained its original formulation while the branding and packaging underwent minor modernizations.

== Legacy ==
The brand remained popular well into the 2000s. Due to its name becoming synonymous with burns, Burnol was often referenced in Indian films, television, and memes to describe emotional or reputational embarrassment, with phrases like “apply Burnol” used in jest.
