= Nematoctonus =

Scientific classification
- Kingdom: Fungi
- Division: Basidiomycota
- Class: Agaricomycetes
- Order: Agaricales
- Family: Pleurotaceae
- Genus: Nematoctonus; Drechsler

Type species
- Nematoctonus tylosporus Drechsler

Genus of fungi

Nematoctonus (the name of which means 'nematode murderer') was a genus of fungi in the Pleurotaceae family, which is now considered a synonym of Hohenbuehelia. Originally the generic name —an anamorphic form of Hohenbuehelia—has a widespread distribution and contains 16 species. Under the one fungus - one name convention, the correct name for the group is Hohenbuehelia and species where the fruitbodies have not been discovered or that are older names for those described as fruitbodies have all been transferred to Hohenbuehelia.

== Species ==
- Nematoctonus angustatus
- Nematoctonus brevisporus
- Nematoctonus campylosporus
- Nematoctonus concurrens
- Nematoctonus cylindrosporus
- Nematoctonus geogenius
- Nematoctonus hamatus
- Nematoctonus haptocladus
- Nematoctonus leiosporus
- Nematoctonus leptosporus
- Nematoctonus lignicola, nom. inval., Art. 37.1
- Nematoctonus pachysporus
- Nematoctonus robustus
- Nematoctonus subreniformis
- Nematoctonus tripolitanius
- Nematoctonus tylosporus
