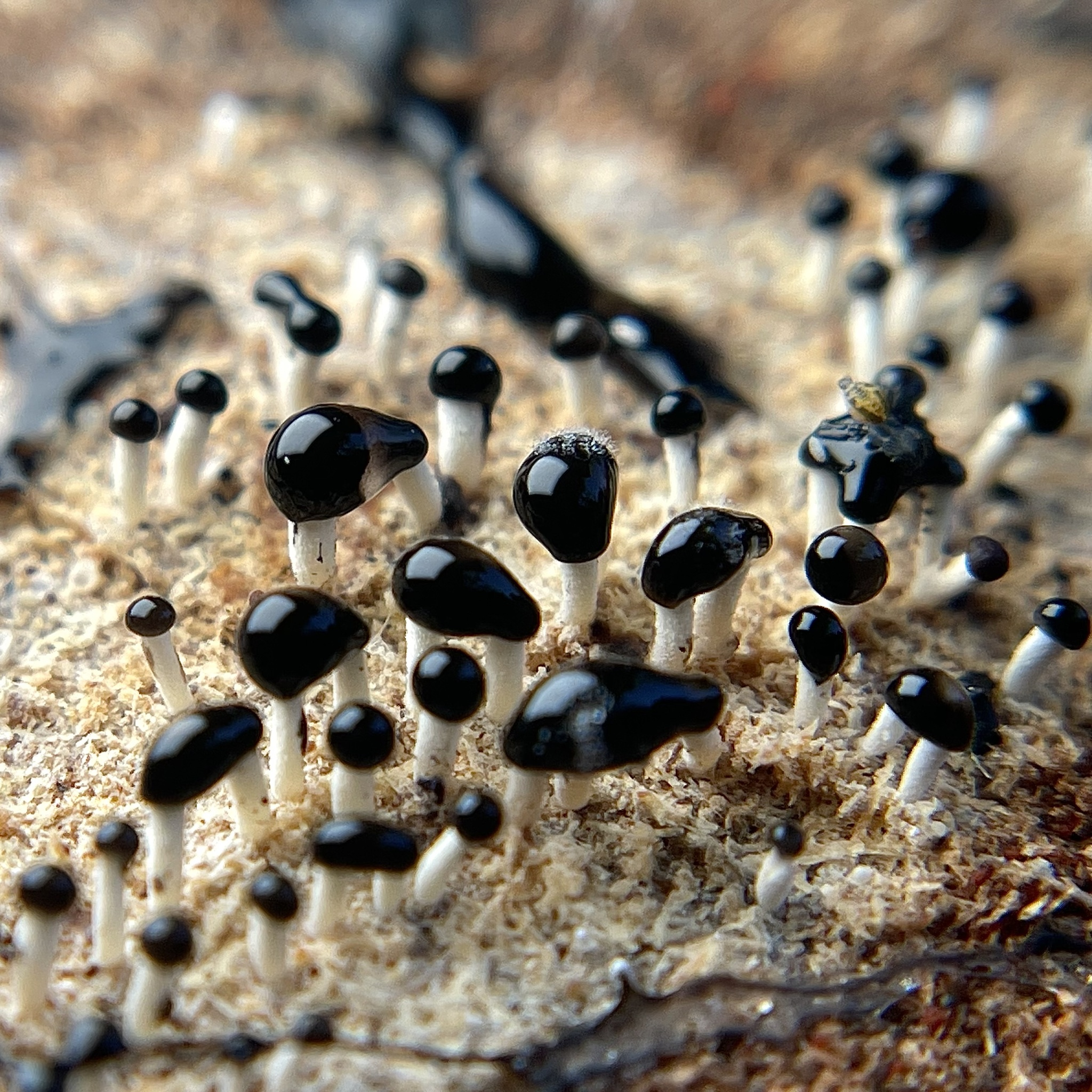
- A. macrocarpa

Scientific classification
- Kingdom: Fungi
- Division: Basidiomycota
- Class: Agaricomycetes
- Order: Agaricales
- Family: Pleurotaceae
- Genus: Antromycopsis; Pat. & Trab.

Type species
- Antromycopsis macrocarpa Pat. & Trab.

Species
- A. fuscosquamulosa A. guzmanii A. macrocarpa

= Antromycopsis =

Genus of fungi

Antromycopsis is a genus of fungi in the Pleurotaceae family. The genus, an anamorphic form of Pleurotus, has a widespread distribution and contains three species.
