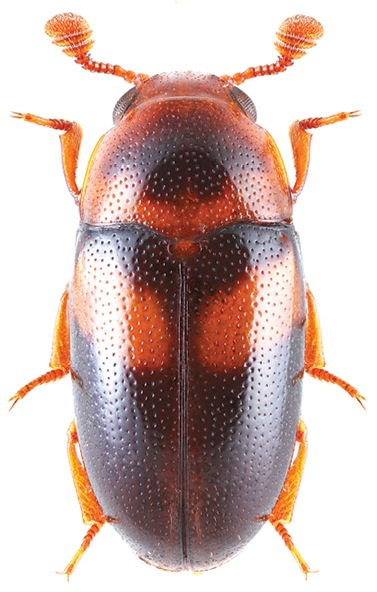
- The invasive Dacne picta, adult from above

Scientific classification
- Kingdom: Animalia
- Phylum: Arthropoda
- Clade: Pancrustacea
- Class: Insecta
- Order: Coleoptera
- Suborder: Polyphaga
- Infraorder: Cucujiformia
- Family: Erotylidae
- Subfamily: Erotylinae
- Tribe: Dacnini
- Genus: Dacne; Latreille, 1797

Type species
- Dermestes bipustulatus Thunberg, 1781

Synonyms
- Cnesophages Reitter, 1875; Engis Paykull, 1800 and see text

= Dacne =

Genus of beetles

Dacne is a genus of pleasing fungus beetles (family Erotylidae). In its family, it is placed in tribe Dacnini of subfamily Erotylinae, or in a distinct subfamily Dacninae. The "trans-Beringian", Neotropical and African members of the genus have been separated in distinct subgenera, which have recently been proposed for full genus status.

The remaining Dacne sensu stricto – the former subgenus Dacne (Dacne) – is not so diverse by Erotylidae standards, but its 17 species occur widely across the Holarctic, mainly in the cooler regions; few range into the tropics. One species, D.picta from northeastern Asia, has proven ecologically adaptable and adept at infesting stored goods, and consequently became established at transport and trade hubs in such far-flung locations as Australia, Eastern Europe, the continental USA, and the Hawaiian Islands.

== Description ==
Like most of their close relatives, Dacne adults are small pill-shaped beetles with antennae that end in distinct clubs. Even by Erotylidae standards they are tiny, about only about 2-4.25 mm (0.1-0.15 in) long. The forepart of their bodies is black and/or reddish-brown; the elytra are typically black, with one reddish blotch or band near the fore ("shoulder") end of each elytron, and in some species a similar but smaller mark near the elytra tips. The elytra spots may be as large as to form continuous bands when the wings are closed. Depending on species, the overall coloration may contain be overwhelmingly reddish-brown to black with some reddish marks.

These beetles can be distinguished from their relatives by the synapomorphic combination of strongly swollen antenna "clubs" (typically asymmetrical or with semicircular shape), and a pronotum whose forward margin bulges to form a "hood" which covers the base of the head up to the center or even the forward edge of the compound eyes. Less unequivocal characters, which still denote many members of this genus but few other pleasing fungus beetles, are the evenly-scattered punctures on the pronotum, whose sides each feature a thin margin, a short-lined prosternum with an inconspicuous central plate, widely separated middle leg attachment points, and a straight border between meso- and metasternum.

Head
The compound eyes of Dacne have small ommatidia, as is usually found in diurnal beetles. Males of this genus have file-like structures on each side of the back of the neck which, when the beetle wiggles its head, rub against the chitin and produce a squeaking sound. Though present in many pleasing fungus beetles, in Dacne these structures are expanded towards the top of the head, angling towards each other. The antennae consist of 11 segments; the third segment is elongated, the individual segments forming the club can be easily distinguished, and the "club" itself is strongly offset from the "stalk" of the antennae. As for the mouthparts, the mentum is wider than high, and the lacinia of the maxilla have two claw-like teeth at the outside, and two smaller and more strongly crooked spines on the inner side of their tip. The end segments of the maxillary palps are longer than wide.

Body, wings and legs
The pronotum is distinct in this genus, forming a pronounced bulge at its forward that covers the back of the head like a hood. In females, this is evenly curved, while in males it has a slight indentation in the center, forming a more or less distinctly two-lobed "hood"; depending on species this may be hard to see however. The outer sides of the pronotum are thickened and set-off from the main pronotal body, forming a beady rounded flange-like margin. The rear edge of the pronotum bulges backwards in the center and also has a margin, but it is very narrow; the front edge is unmargined. On the prosternum, impressed lines run from the rear to the foreleg coxae, and even a bit further (though not far and without meeting) in some species. The mesosternum is short and wide, its width between the mesocoxae at least half again as much as it is long, and it lacks coxal lines. On the metasternum the coxal lines are entirely missing, while those on the abdomen are vestigial and slightly tapering towards the front.

The elytra have a margin at the entire base and are covered in small punctures, mostly strewn irregularly, but in places slightly more regular and in many species interspersed with small dark patches, forming vague lengthwise lines. On the legs' tarsi, the three basal segments are equally wide and have a few bristles on the underside, while the fourth segment is somewhat shorter than the third, but not altered otherwise and fully functional. The last (fifth) segment bears two strong claws.

Genitalia
The male genitalia of Dacne sensu stricto has a trough-shaped membranous tegmen, concave from below and lightly sclerotized on the sides between two dorsal and two lateral struts; it ends in two lateral lobes. At the base of the dorsal struts, there are two wide plates which are slightly fused in the center and overlie the median lobe; two smaller sideward plates are further tipwards on the dorsal struts, at the bases of the lateral lobes. The lateral struts extend arm-like around the sides of the median lobe base; their bases, while adjacent to each other, are not joined. Near the base of the dorsal strut, there is an oblique seam in the lateral struts, and just beyond they expand towards the back and the base of the median lobe with a sharply cut-off flap. The lateral struts then continue on the lower side of the lateral lobes. The lateral lobes connect to the basal piece by a membrane, or directly where they are also adjacent to the lateral struts; they are moderately long and usually touch in the upper midline for their entire length, and have a row of small bristles on the lower sides. The median lobe is smoothly arcing, compressed, and strongly narrowed towards the tip, which is pointed on the underside. It is also slightly narrowed at its base near the median foramen. The rear two-thirds of its backside are membranous, with a large median orifice, and the underside is more strongly sclerotized. The median strut has a thicker proximal end; is half again as long as the median lobe, and narrowly and flexibly attached to the lobe's forward back above the median foramen. Seen from above or below, the median strut is narrow and has a lengthwise seam in the center. The well-developed internal sac is roughly as long as the median lobe and conspicuously inflated. At the proximal end it has a sclerotized and more or less expanded knob, to which the sac's retractor muscle attaches. Through this knob, the ejaculatory duct passes as a well-sclerotized tube which extends for some distance into the internal sac. Beyond that tube, the sclerotization continues on the underside of the sperm channel, where it forms V-shaped side panels, or not at all.

The female genitalia of Dacne sensu stricto have an interesting genital tube with several peculiarities. The eighth tergite is membranous in front, sclerotized at the sides as well as on the rear, where it also has a row of small bristles. Similar bristles are found on the eighth sternite, which is fully sclerotized, with a strong rod extending from its central front for twice the sternite's length. Abdominal segment 9 is not sclerotized. It bears two lengthwise rows of tooth-like lamellae on the back, two on the belly, and two smaller ones on each side; such structures in this arrangement are found in few other Erotylidae and have been called "comb rows" by researchers. Each row bears at most 10 teeth, but may have only one. They point outward and forward and attach to a thickening of the segment's membrane. Between the teeth, the membrane carries tiny microscopic spikes, which are rooted through the membrane with a small bubble on the inside, all pointing into the same direction as the teeth. The teeth appear as if they were much larger aggregates of these spikes, with some intermediate-sized structures also present to form a somewhat fractal-like surface. While these structures are conspicuous (under a light microscope) and almost unique to this genus, their function is not clear. Their position changes depending on whether the genital tube is everted or retreated; in the latter case they might clasp the male genitals during copulation, while in the former they might hold open a tube bored into fungi when laying eggs. The ninth's segments appendages are limited to a simple coxite and a valvifer per side, but lack gonostyli. On the back between the valvifers there are two stiffening sclerotized lengthwise stripes called "paraprocts", which extend to form the tenth abdominal tergite with their fused widened and bluntly rounded rear ends; they are also known as "proctigeral lobes" or (more ambiguously) as "proctiger". On each upper-and underside of the valvifers, body wall folds form a baculum, to whose distal ends the gonocoxites attach; immediately below is the anus. The gonocoxites are markedly sclerotized into chisel-like structures; they can rotate in the horizontal around the bacula attachments, possibly forming a sort of ovipositor. On the ventral side of the vulva, the margin of the genital aperture or a distinct lobe below is present in many Dacne, and in some it is well-developed and has a distinct shape.

== Ecology ==
Like most pleasing fungus beetles, Dacne seem to eat fungi as larvae and adults. Larvae of several species have been studied, having been recovered from and raised on fungi. Adults are sometimes found hiding under tree bark.

== Species ==
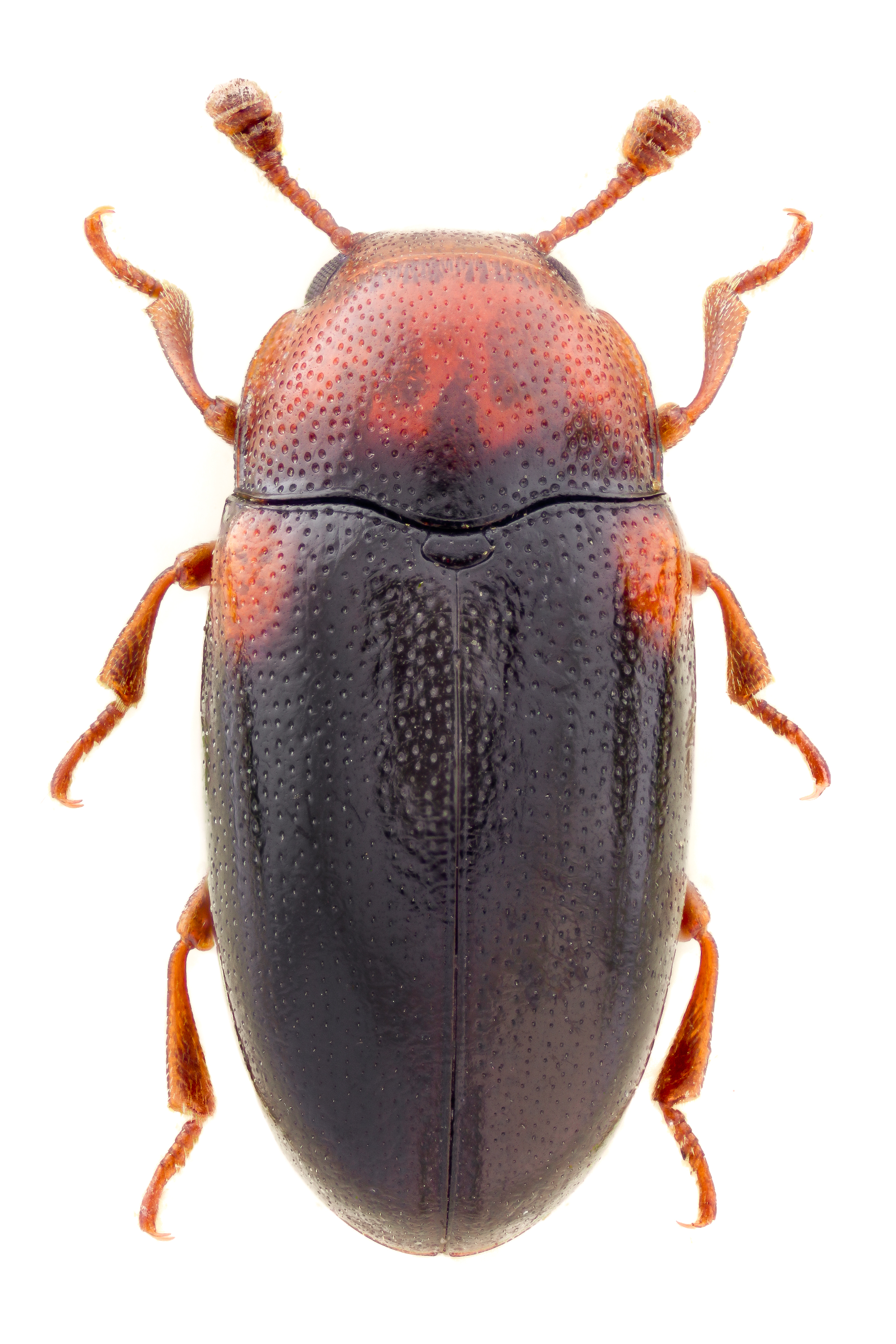
Dacne rufifrons, adult from above

The following species, forming the former subgenus Dacne (Dacne), are retained in the reduced genus Dacne. They occur in Eurasia, from Europe eastwards north of the Alpides chain, to Japan and Taiwan, and from there around the eastern Himalaya to Southeast Asia, India and Sri Lanka; some occur in North America and the genus barely extends into Central America:

- Dacne akitai Narukawa, 1992
- Dacne bipustulata (Thunberg, 1781) (= D.humeralis, D.jekeli, D.scanicus)
- Dacne californica (Horn, 1870)
- Dacne fungorum Lewis, 1887 (= D.nigrocephala)
- Dacne indica (Crotch, 1876)
- Dacne japonica Crotch, 1873
- Dacne kidoi Nakane, 1981
- Dacne minima Nikitsky & Kompantzev, 1995
- Dacne notata (Gmelin, 1790) (= D.bipustulata (Fabricius, 1787) non Thunberg, 1781)
- Dacne optabilis Gorham, 1896
- Dacne osawai Ashida & Kim, 1999
- Dacne picta Crotch, 1873
- Dacne pontica (Bedel, 1868)
- Dacne pulchella Arrow, 1925
- Dacne quadrimaculata (Say, 1835)
- Dacne rufifrons (Fabricius, 1775) (= D.angustata, D.binaeva, D.flava)
- Dacne semirufula (Reitter, 1897)

In addition to the described species, an unidentified population (probably a distinct species) is known from southern France, where specimens were collected and their COI-5P DNA barcode sampled.

A COI phylogeny of 5 Dacne sensu stricto suggested (with high but not outstanding support throughout) a close relationship between D.quadrimaculata and the Eurasian D.rufifrons, with D.bipustulata next closest to these among the species sampled, the undescribed French species more distant, and D.picta the most basal member of the clade.

Fossil remains found in Baltic amber and assigned to Dacne would presumably belong to this subgenus.

=== Afrodacne ===
African species:

- Dacne aequinoctialis (Thomson, 1858) (= D.capensis)
- Dacne clavata Delkeskamp, 1954
- Dacne nigropicta Delkeskamp, 1954
- Dacne rufa Delkeskamp, 1954

=== Ameridacne ===
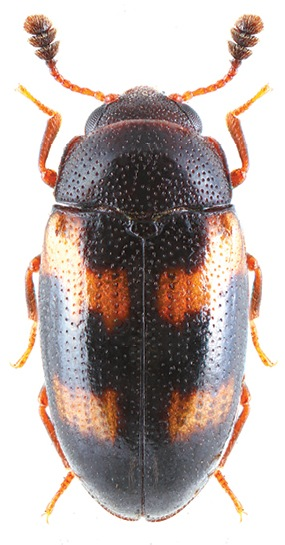
Dacne/Xenodacne tangliangi

A single extant Brazilian species is placed here as of 2023, but undescribed species may conceivably exist in the Neotropics:

- Dacne ducke Skelley, 2004

In addition to the living member, the fossil Dacne brodzinskyi from Miocene Dominican amber was assigned to this (sub)genus by Skelley in 1997. Both species share some peculiar traits that suggest they might not even be particularly close to Dacne, but instead belong to a different subfamily of Erotylidae.

=== Xenodacne ===
Front side of pronotum less bulging, not forming large "hood" between eyes, and not sexually dimorphic; side margins of pronotum thin towards the read, forward ends swollen to a thicker bead. Elytra punctures very irregular. Males and females with identical small sound-producing files on neck. Found in northern East Asia and in northwestern North America west of the Rocky Mountains, indicating dispersal across the Bering Strait:

- Dacne cyclochilus Boyle, 1954
- Dacne hujiayaoi Dai & Zhao, 2013
- Dacne maculata Chûjô, 1940 (formerly in Dacne (Dacne))
- Dacne picea LeConte, 1875 (= D.vittata)
- Dacne pubescens Boyle, 1956
- Dacne tangliangi Dai & Zhao, 2013
- Dacne zonaria Lewis, 1887 (= D.jureceki; formerly in Dacne (Dacne))
