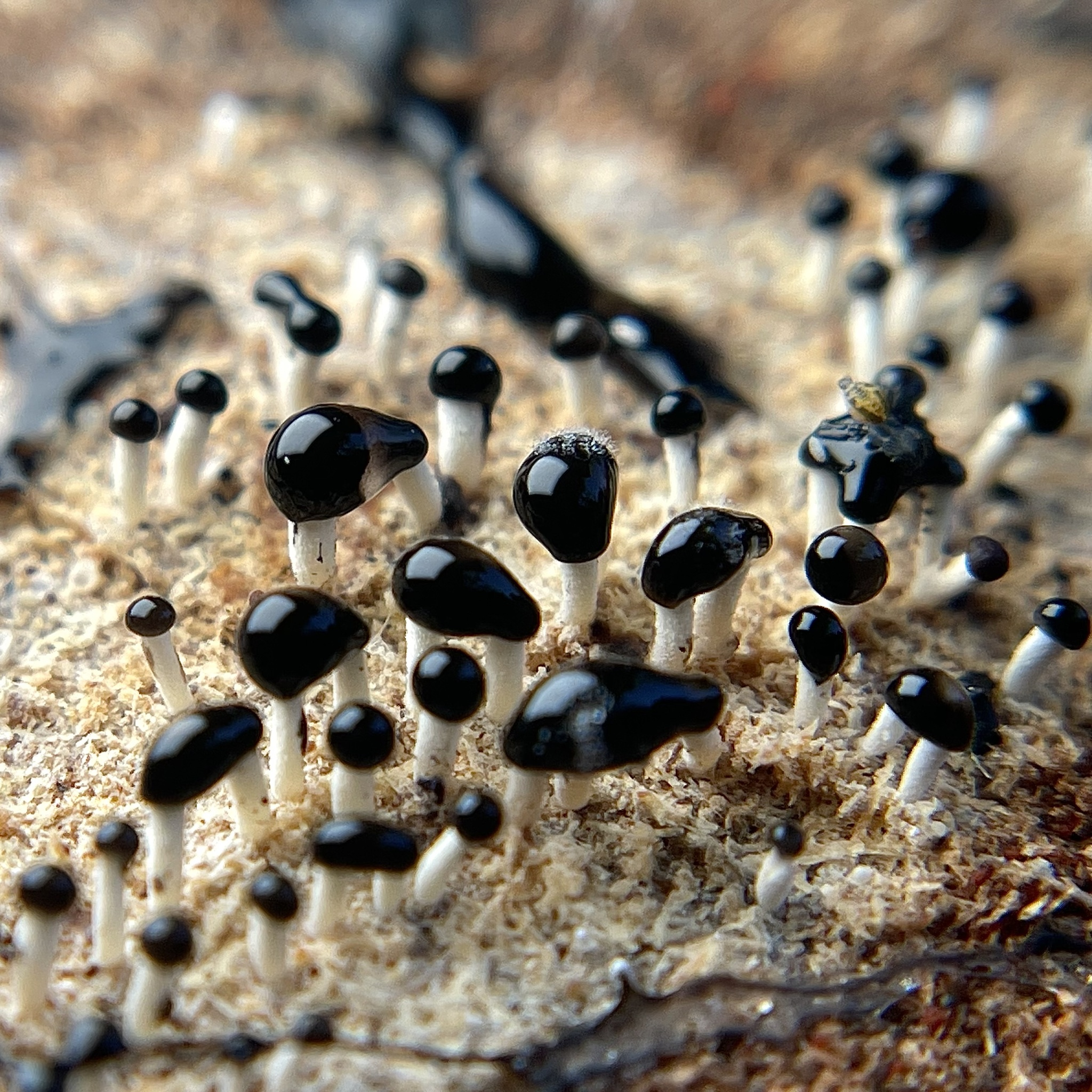
- Anamorphic state of P. cystidiosus

Scientific classification
- Kingdom: Fungi
- Division: Basidiomycota
- Class: Agaricomycetes
- Order: Agaricales
- Family: Pleurotaceae
- Genus: Pleurotus
- Species: P. cystidiosus

Binomial name
- Pleurotus cystidiosus O.K. Mill.

Synonyms
- Pleurotus cystidiosus (Y.H. Han, K.M. Chen & S. Cheng) O. Hilber ex O. Hilber 1997; Pleurotus cystidiosus var. formosensis Moncalvo 1995; Pleurotus cystidiosus (Y.H. Han, K.M. Chen & S. Cheng) O. Hilber 1993; Antromycopsis macrocarpa (Ellis & Everh.) Stalpers, Seifert & Samson 1991; Pleurotus abalonus Y.H. Han, K.M. Chen & S. Cheng 1974; Pleurotus cystidiosus O.K. Mill. 1969; Pleurotus cystidiosus var. cystidiosus O.K. Mill. 1969; Antromycopsis broussonetiae Pat. & Trab. 1897; Stilbum macrocarpum Ellis & Everh. 1886

= Pleurotus cystidiosus =

Species of fungus

Pleurotus cystidiosus
- Mycological characteristics
- Gills on hymenium
- Cap is offset
- Hymenium is decurrent
- Stipe is bare
- Spore print is white
- Ecology is saprotrophic
- Edibility is edible

Pleurotus cystidiosus, also known as abalone mushroom and maple oyster mushroom, is an edible species of fungus in the family Pleurotaceae, described as new to science by mycologist Orson K. Miller Jr. in 1969. It can be cultivated, with spores and growing kits being available commercially. Antromycopsis macrocarpa (or A. broussonetiae) is the anamorphic form of this species.

== See also ==
- List of Pleurotus species
