= Nothopanus noctilucens =

Scientific classification
- Kingdom: Fungi
- Division: Basidiomycota
- Class: Agaricomycetes
- Order: Agaricales
- Family: Marasmiaceae
- Genus: Nothopanus
- Species: N. noctilucens

Binomial name
- Nothopanus noctilucens (Lév.) Singer (1973)

Synonyms
- Agaricus noctilucens Lév. (1844)

Species of fungus

Nothopanus noctilucens is a species of agaric fungus in the family Marasmiaceae. Found in Japan, the fruit bodies of the fungus are bioluminescent.

== See also ==
- List of bioluminescent fungi
