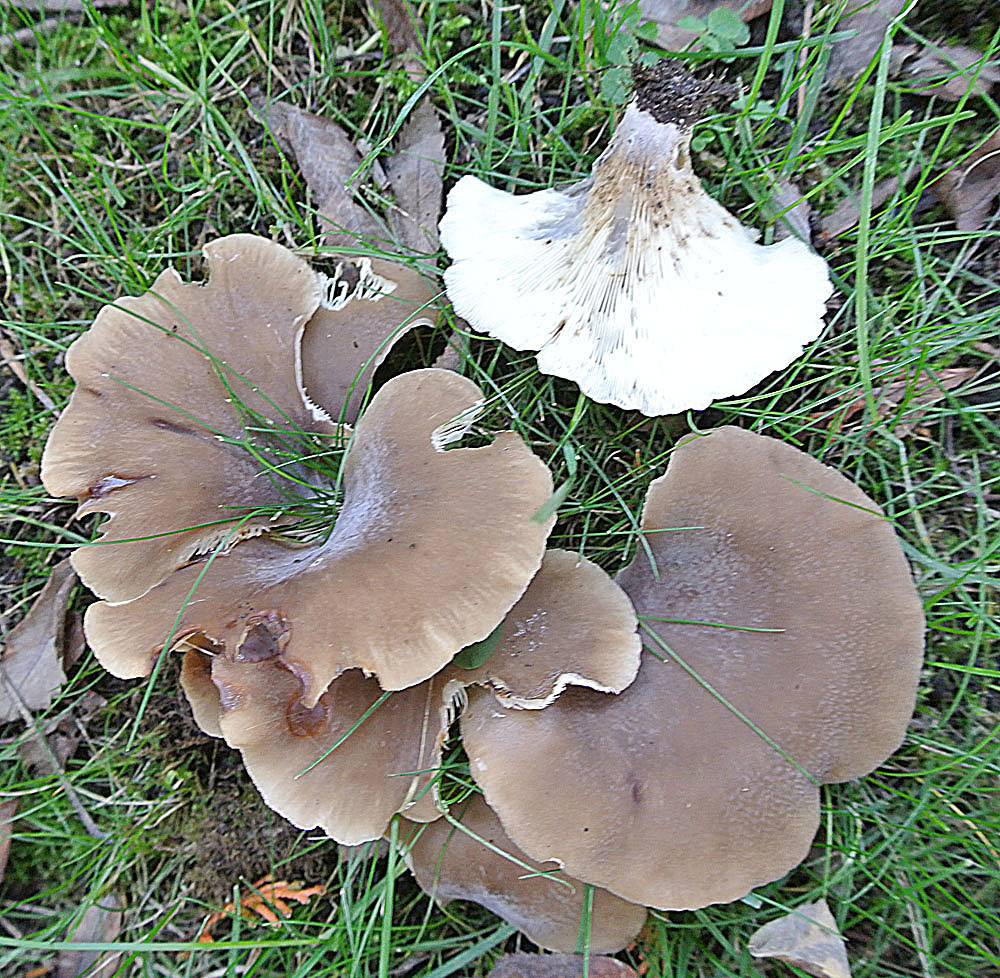

Scientific classification
- Kingdom: Fungi
- Division: Basidiomycota
- Class: Agaricomycetes
- Order: Agaricales
- Family: Pleurotaceae
- Genus: Hohenbuehelia
- Species: H. petaloides

Binomial name
- Hohenbuehelia petaloides (Bull.) Schulzer

Synonyms
- Agaricus petaloides Bull.

= Hohenbuehelia petaloides =

Species of fungus

Hohenbuehelia petaloides, commonly known as the leaflike oyster or the shoehorn oyster mushroom, is a species of agaric fungus belonging to the family Pleurotaceae. The fruit bodies have pale to brown funnel-shaped caps with decurrent gills. The species has a cosmopolitan distribution and is found near the decaying wood it feeds on. It is reputedly edible but not choice.

== Taxonomy ==
The species was first described in 1785 by Jean Baptiste François Pierre Bulliard. It was later assigned to the new genus, Hohenbuehelia, in 1866 by Stephan Schulzer von Müggenburg. Synonyms include Hohenbuehelia geogenia and Pleurotus petaloides.

== Description ==
The cap ranges from fan-shaped to funnel-shaped, growing up to 10 centimetres (4 in) wide. The cap surface is smooth or microscopically hairy and ranges in color from pale or whitish (often when young) to brown. The gills are decurrent and are often crowded and narrow. The stem is either absent or short and attached laterally. The texture is tough or rubbery due to the gelatinous layer under the cuticle. The mushroom has a mild to mealy taste and odor.

=== Similar species ===
Outside of its genus, it can resemble members of Crepidotus.

== Habitat and distribution ==
The species is saprobic, feeding on decaying wood. It can be found either alone or clustering in small groups around woody debris or the occasional stump. The species is considered to have a cosmopolitan distribution and is known to be found in regions including North America, Venezuela, Europe, Japan, and New Zealand. Like most Pleurotaceae, it is nematophagous.

== Uses ==
The species is considered edible, although the tough texture may not be appealing.
