= Agaricochaete =

Scientific classification
- Kingdom: Fungi
- Division: Basidiomycota
- Class: Agaricomycetes
- Order: Agaricales
- Family: Pleurotaceae
- Genus: Agaricochaete; Eichelb.

Species
- A. hericium A. indica A. keniensis A. mirabilis

Genus of fungi

Agaricochaete is a genus of fungi in the Pleurotaceae family. The genus contains four species found in Africa and Asia.
