= Aminoacridine =

Chemical structure of 1-aminoacridine

Aminoacridine may refer to any of several chemical compounds:

- 2-Aminoacridine
- 3-Aminoacridine
- 4-Aminoacridine
- 9-Aminoacridine
