= Dimethylaziridine carboxylic acid =

Identifiers
CAS Number	35574-32-4; (2S): 1275621-85-6
3D model (JSmol)	Interactive image; (2S): Interactive image
ChEBI	(2S): CHEBI:210424
ChemSpider	(2S): 78442764
PubChem CID	55287082; (2S): 53235787
- InChI: InChI=1S/C5H9NO2/c1-5(2)3(6-5)4(7)8/h3,6H,1-2H3,(H,7,8) Key: LQNRQHXPYZSWHH-UHFFFAOYSA-N; (2S): InChI=1S/C5H9NO2/c1-5(2)3(6-5)4(7)8/h3,6H,1-2H3,(H,7,8)/t3-/m1/s1 Key: LQNRQHXPYZSWHH-GSVOUGTGSA-N
- SMILES: CC1(C(N1)C(=O)O)C; (2S): CC1([C@H](N1)C(=O)O)C

Properties
Chemical formula	C_{5}H_{9}NO_{2}
Molar mass	115.13 g·mol^{−1}
- Except where otherwise noted, data are given for materials in their standard state (at 25 °C [77 °F], 100 kPa). Infobox references

Dimethylaziridine carboxylic acid or pleurocybellaziridin is a naturally occurring non-proteinogenic amino acid that contains the unusual aziridine ring. It is found in the potentially deadly angel wing mushroom.

== Occurrence ==
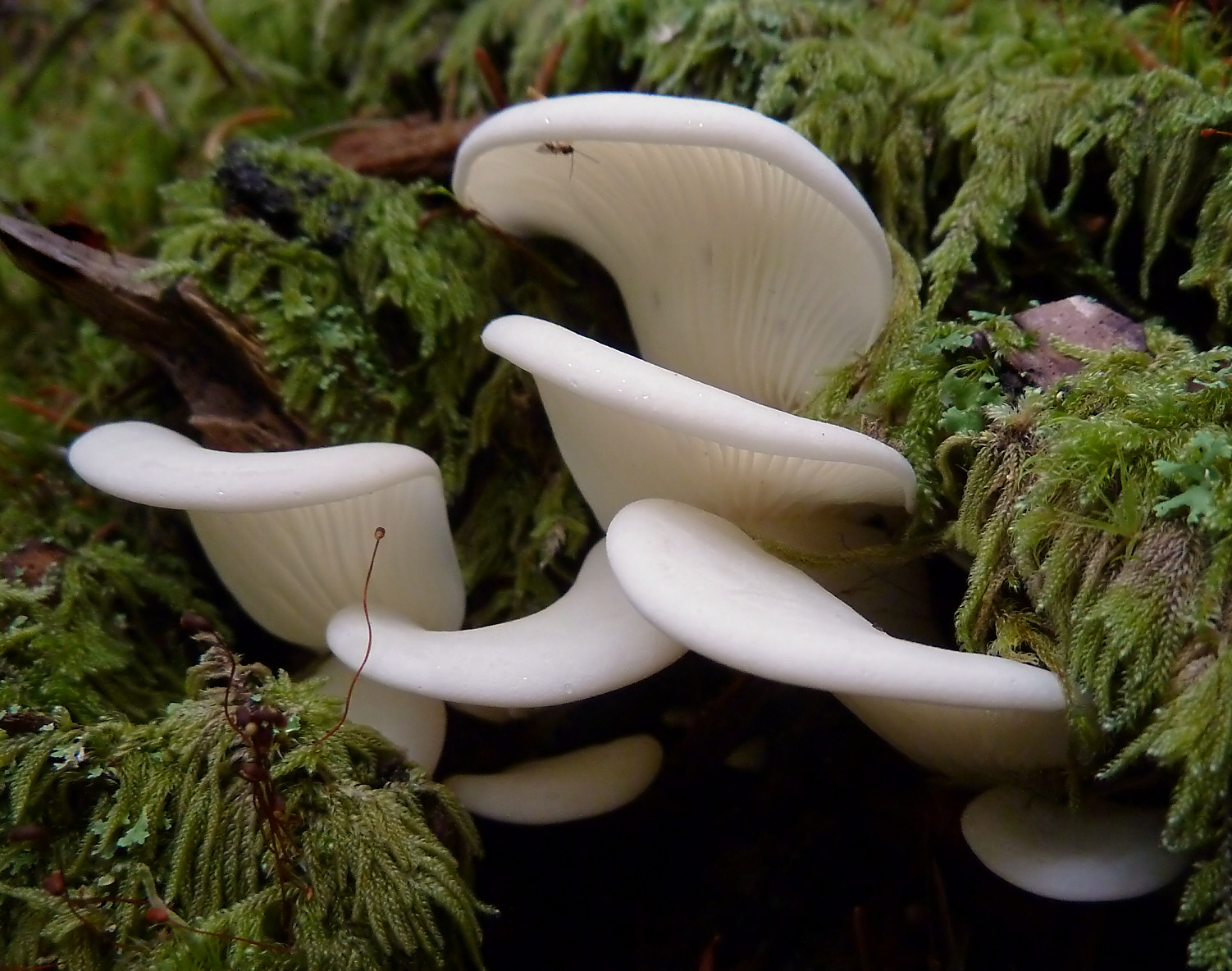
Pleurocybella porrigens

Dimethylaziridine carboxylic acid occurs in enantiopure 2S form in the mushroom Pleurocybella porrigens. The compound is very unstable, but can be isolated as an ester of benzhydrol by reacting the methanol extract of Pleurocybella mushrooms with diphenyldiazomethane. In one case, 23 mg of the ester derivative was isolated from 4 g of freeze-dried mushrooms. The compound is synthesized by members of the fungal kingdom as an offshoot of valine biosynthesis, involving an oxygenase that uses α-ketoglutaric acid and iron (II) ions as cofactors.

== Synthesis ==
The synthesis starts with a derivative of serine known as Garner's ester. In the first step, this compound is reacted with methylmagnesium bromide to form a tertiary alcohol. The ring is then opened up with pyridinium tosylate. The hydroxyl group of the ring opened compound is then oxidized to a carboxylic acid using a mix of TEMPO, sodium chlorite, and PIDA dissolved in acetonitrile. This carboxylic acid is then reacted with diazomethane in diethyl ether to form the methyl ester. The BOC protecting group is removed by reaction with gaseous hydrogen chloride in methanol, and the amino group is protected again with 2,4-dinitrobenzenesulfonyl chloride using 2,6-lutidine as the base. The aziridine ring system of the amino acid is formed by reaction with diisopropyl azodicarboxylate and triphenylphosphane (A type of Mitsunobu reaction). All protecting groups are then removed by reaction with propylamine in dichloromethane to give the final product.

== Toxicology ==
The genus Pleurocybella occurs worldwide in temperate climates and Pleurocybella porrigens was a particularly popular edible mushroom in Japan. In 2004, 17 people died there after eating the mushrooms. The affected individuals mainly suffered from chronic kidney failure, which explains why the mushrooms can often be consumed without any recognizable health consequences. The toxicity is attributed to this carboxylic acid, which damages oligodendrocytes and can thus cause encephalopathy.
