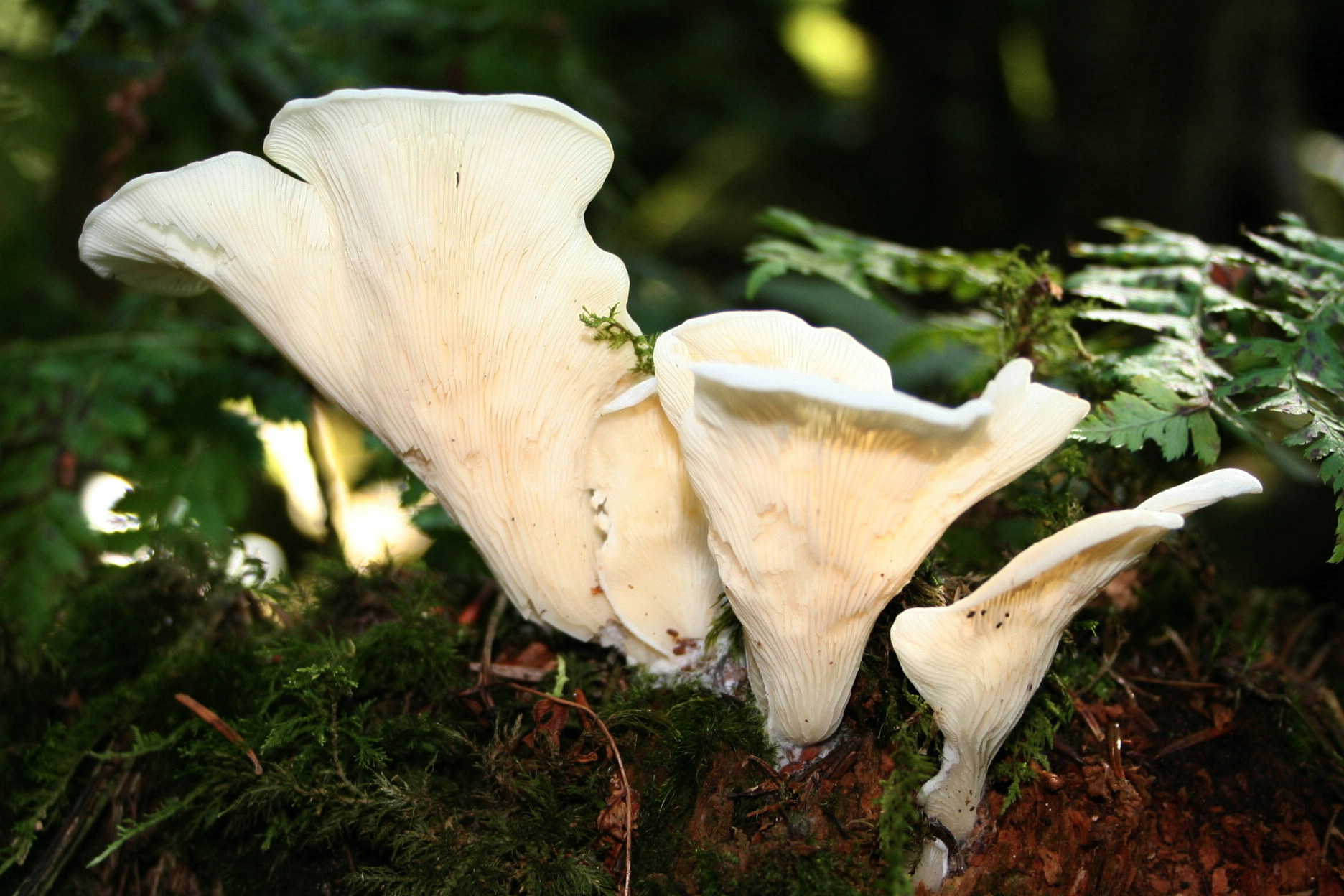

Scientific classification
- Kingdom: Fungi
- Division: Basidiomycota
- Class: Agaricomycetes
- Order: Agaricales
- Family: Phyllotopsidaceae
- Genus: Pleurocybella
- Species: P. porrigens

Binomial name
- Pleurocybella porrigens (Pers.) Singer (1947)

= Pleurocybella porrigens =

Species of fungus in the family Marasmiaceae

Pleurocybella porrigens
- Mycological characteristics
- Gills on hymenium
- Cap is infundibuliform
- Hymenium is decurrent
- Stipe is bare
- Spore print is white
- Ecology is saprotrophic
- Edibility is not recommended or deadly

Pleurocybella porrigens, also known as the angel wing, is a species of fungus in the family Phyllotopsidaceae. It medium-sized fruit bodies are whitish and fan-shaped. It is a wood-decay fungus on conifer wood and is widespread in temperate forests of the Northern Hemisphere.

== Taxonomy ==
Synonyms for the species include Pleurotus porrigens, Phyllotus porrigens, Dendrosarcus porrigens, Pleurotellus porrigens, and Nothopanus porrigens.

== Description ==
The mushroom species is distinguished by its fruit bodies, pure white when young and sometimes yellowing with age. The cap is about 4–9 centimetres (1 1/2–3 1/2 in) wide, shaped like a petal or a fan. The stipe is either very short or completely absent, and the flesh has a faint but pleasant smell. The gills are crowded, and decurrent if a stipe is present. The flesh is thin and fragile compared to the oyster mushrooms (Pleurotus ssp.). The spore print is white.

== Distribution and habitat ==
The species is widespread in temperate forests of the Northern Hemisphere. In North America, it can be found from August to November. It is a white-rot wood-decay fungus on conifer wood, particularly hemlock (genus Tsuga).

== Toxicity ==
Chemical structure of the suspected toxic amino acid

P. porrigens was once generally regarded as edible, though bland. As of 2011, it is a suspect in two outbreaks in Japan involving fatal encephalopathy. Most victims had preexisting kidney disorders.

The first incident occurred in September and October 2004 across nine prefectures in Japan, documenting the sickening of 59 people and the eventual death of 17. Most of those who died had preexisting liver problems and the average age of those affected was 70. Death occurred between 13 and 29 days after the onset of symptoms, which occurred at most three weeks after consumption of the species.

The second incident occurred in 2009, when a 65-year-old man who had been on hemodialysis died from acute encephalopathy after eating P. porrigens.

The mechanism of action for the toxicity of P. porrigens has not been definitively established, but several possibilities have been suggested. It has been demonstrated that P. porrigens contains an unusual amino acid, Pleurocybellaziridin, which is toxic to the brain cells of rats in cell culture studies, but it has not yet been possible to definitively determine that this was the cause of the fatal encephalopathies. Other mechanisms have been suggested for P. porrigens's apparent toxicity, including the possibility that the fungus may contain toxic levels of cyanide salts.

A proposed mechanism of action for the toxicity of P. porrigens has been proposed by Kawagishi, et al. They suggest the toxicity is due to three constituents that work in combination to produce encephalopathy, Pleurocybelline a heat stable and high molecular weight glycoprotein, Pleurocybella porrigens lectin a purified lectin, and Pleurocybellaziridine an amino acid derivative.

Experimental studies in rodents showed that the Pleurocybelline and Pleurocybella porrignes lectin form a complex exhibiting non-specific proteolytic activity that disrupts the blood-brain barrier. Injection of this combination into mice resulted in degradation of protein substrates and the disappearance of the marker GLUT1 which indicates disruption of the blood-brain barrier. This activity is proposed to arise from the functional interaction of the two proteins, where their combination gains proteolytic properties not present in either protein alone. This leads to broad degradation of extracellular and membrane associated proteins required for blood-brain barrier disruption. Although neither protein alone is directly neurotoxic, this disruption is proposed to enable Pleurocybellaziridine to enter brain cells. Pleurocybellaziridine was found after the comparison of related amino acid derivatives which led researchers to infer the existence of a precursor. Once the blood-brain barrier is compromised Pleurocybellaziridine was able to access neural tissue, where it is thought to exert cytotoxic effects, particularly on oligodendrocytes. Experiments demonstrated that administration of all three compounds together induced apoptosis in the hippocampus and produced pathological changes that are consistent with acute encephalopathy. The compounds administered individually or in pairs did not produce these effects.

== See also ==
- List of deadly fungi
