= Pleurotus fuscosquamulosus =

Scientific classification
- Domain: Eukaryota
- Kingdom: Fungi
- Division: Basidiomycota
- Class: Agaricomycetes
- Order: Agaricales
- Family: Pleurotaceae
- Genus: Pleurotus
- Species: P. fuscosquamulosus

Binomial name
- Pleurotus fuscosquamulosus D.A.Reid & Eicker (1998)

Species of fungus

Pleurotus fuscosquamulosus is a species of fungus in the family Pleurotaceae. Found in South Africa, it was described as new to science by mycologists Derek Reid and Albert Eicker in 1998. The anamorphic form of the fungus is known as Antromycopsis fuscosquamulosus.

== See also ==
- List of Pleurotus species
