= 2-Aminoacridine =

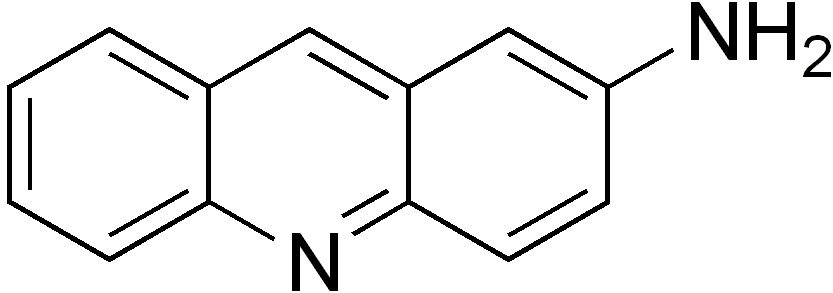

Names
- Preferred IUPAC name Acridin-2-amine

Identifiers
CAS Number	581-28-2
3D model (JSmol)	Interactive image; Interactive image
ChEMBL	ChEMBL146566
ChemSpider	10906
PubChem CID	11384
UNII	FZ24NE6LYA
CompTox Dashboard (EPA)	DTXSID50206818
- InChI: InChI=1S/C13H10N2/c14-11-5-6-13-10(8-11)7-9-3-1-2-4-12(9)15-13/h1-8H,14H2 Key: UTXPWBKKZFLMPZ-UHFFFAOYSA-N; InChI=1/C13H10N2/c14-11-5-6-13-10(8-11)7-9-3-1-2-4-12(9)15-13/h1-8H,14H2 Key: UTXPWBKKZFLMPZ-UHFFFAOYAK
- SMILES: C1=CC=C2C(=C1)C=C3C=C(C=CC3=N2)N; n1c3c(cc2c1cccc2)cc(cc3)N

Properties
Chemical formula	C_{13}H_{10}N_{2}
Molar mass	194.23 g/mol
- Except where otherwise noted, data are given for materials in their standard state (at 25 °C [77 °F], 100 kPa). verify (what is ?) Infobox references

2-Aminoacridine is an aminoacridine.

== See also ==
- 3-Aminoacridine
- 4-Aminoacridine
- 9-Aminoacridine
