= 3-Aminoacridine =

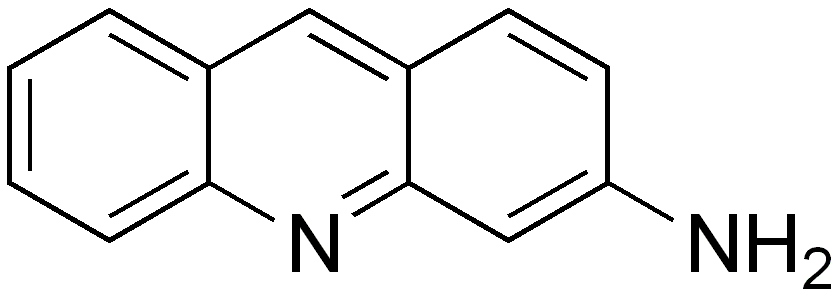

Names
- Preferred IUPAC name Acridin-3-amine

Identifiers
CAS Number	581-29-3
3D model (JSmol)	Interactive image; Interactive image
ChEMBL	ChEMBL148204
ChemSpider	10907
ECHA InfoCard	100.008.603
PubChem CID	11385
UNII	5T83GY5877
CompTox Dashboard (EPA)	DTXSID10206819
- InChI: InChI=1S/C13H10N2/c14-11-6-5-10-7-9-3-1-2-4-12(9)15-13(10)8-11/h1-8H,14H2 Key: GHCKERHPOQWERJ-UHFFFAOYSA-N; InChI=1/C13H10N2/c14-11-6-5-10-7-9-3-1-2-4-12(9)15-13(10)8-11/h1-8H,14H2 Key: GHCKERHPOQWERJ-UHFFFAOYAH
- SMILES: C1=CC=C2C(=C1)C=C3C=CC(=CC3=N2)N; n1c3c(cc2c1cccc2)ccc(c3)N

Properties
Chemical formula	C_{13}H_{10}N_{2}
Molar mass	194.23 g/mol
- Except where otherwise noted, data are given for materials in their standard state (at 25 °C [77 °F], 100 kPa). verify (what is ?) Infobox references

3-Aminoacridine is an aminoacridine.

== See also ==
- 2-Aminoacridine
- 4-Aminoacridine
- 9-Aminoacridine
