= Fallen Leaf, California =

Unincorporated community in California, United States

Fallen Leaf
- Unincorporated community
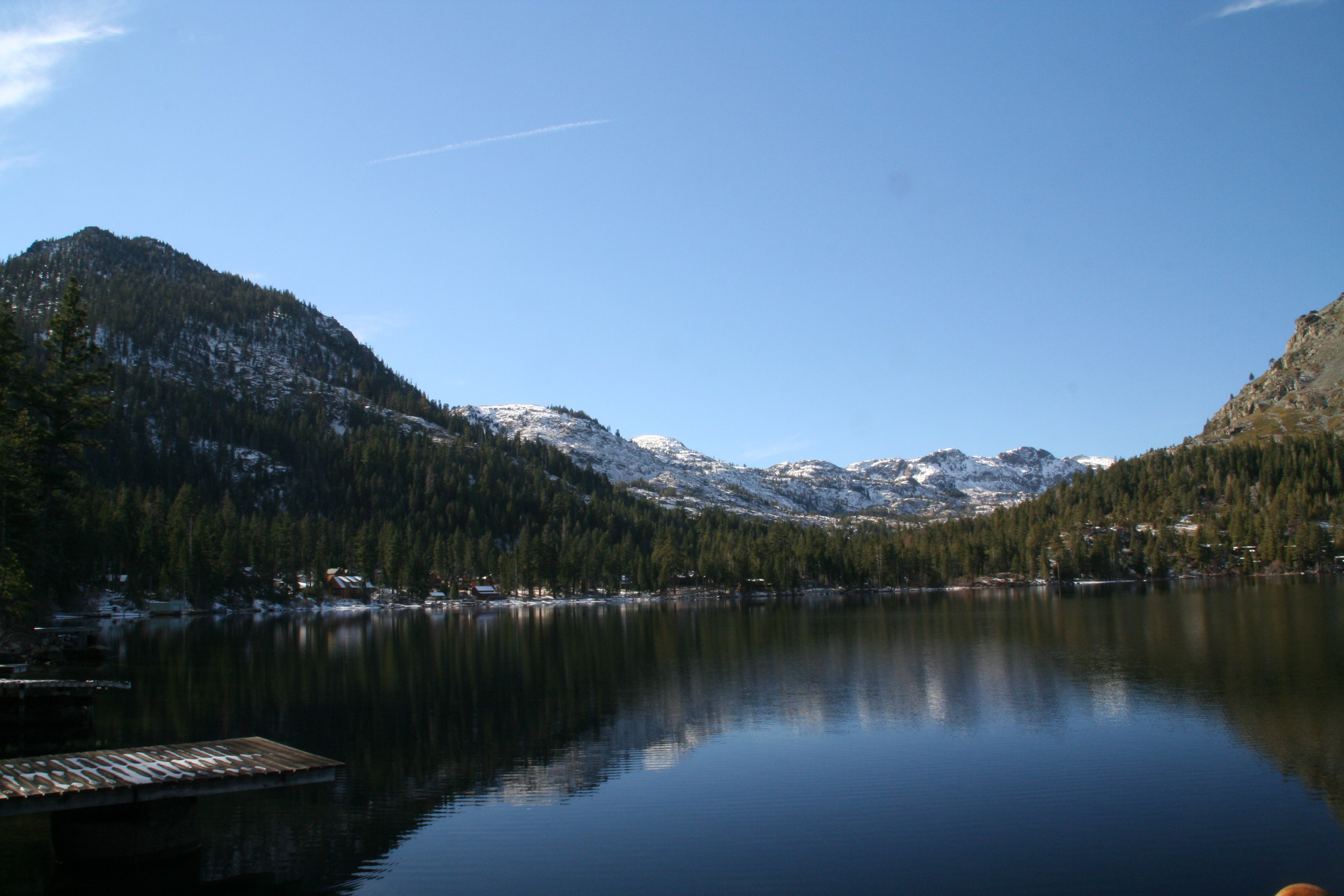
- The small town of Fallen Leaf sits along the south shore of Fallen Leaf Lake. The Desolation Wilderness can be seen in the background.

- Location in California Fallen Leaf (the United States)
- Coordinates: 38°52′59″N 120°04′22″W
- Country: United States
- State: California
- County: El Dorado
- Elevation: 6,427 ft (1,959 m)

Fallen Leaf is an unincorporated community in El Dorado County, California, United States. It is located at the south end of Fallen Leaf Lake, at an elevation of 6527 feet (1959 m).

A resort called Fallen Leaf Lodge was founded by William W. Price in 1908. A post office opened in that year.
