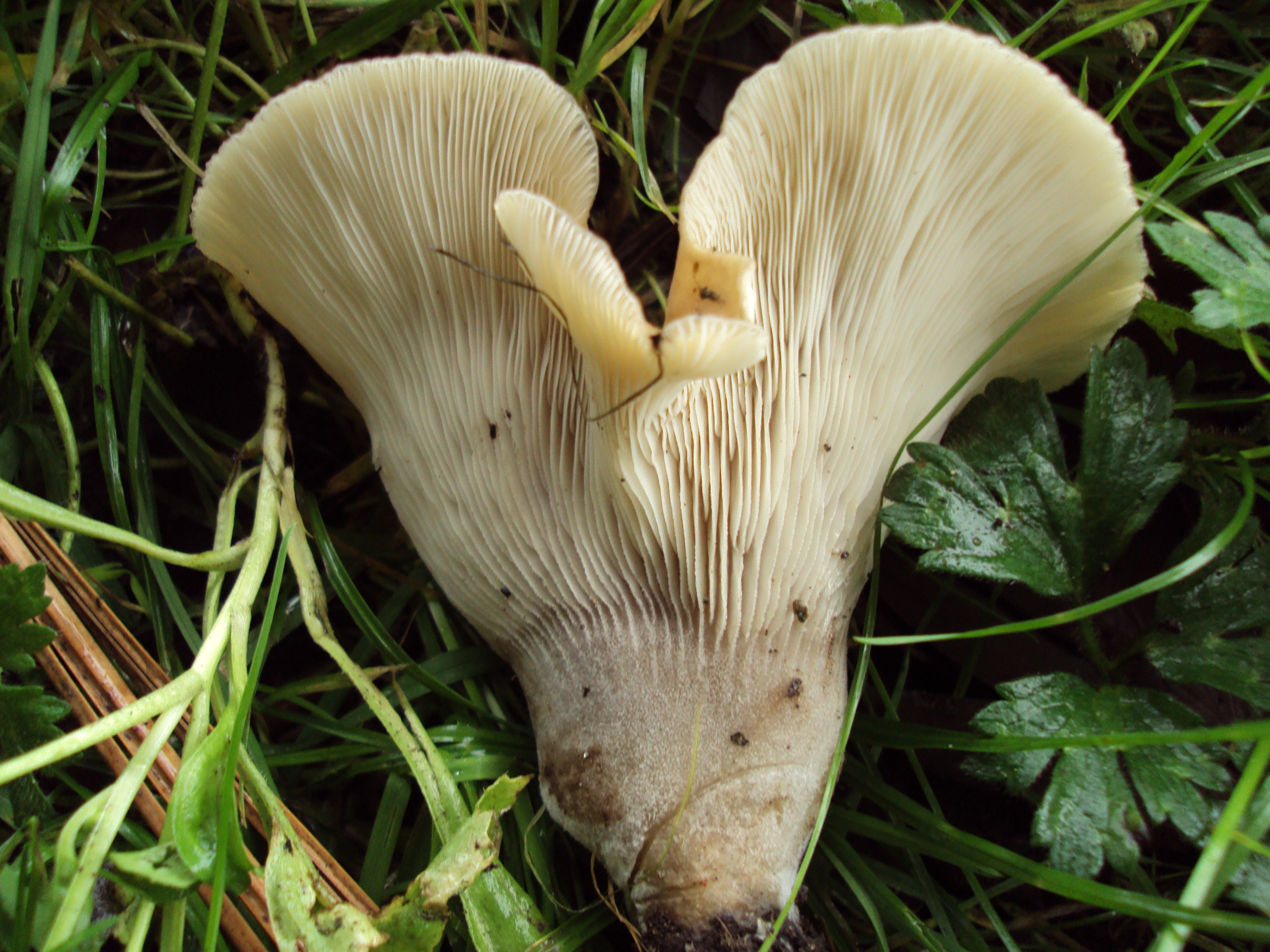
- Hohenbuehelia petaloides

Scientific classification
- Kingdom: Fungi
- Division: Basidiomycota
- Class: Agaricomycetes
- Order: Agaricales
- Family: Pleurotaceae
- Genus: Hohenbuehelia; Schulzer (1866)

Type species
- Hohenbuehelia petaloides (Bull.) Schulzer

= Hohenbuehelia =

Genus of fungi

Hohenbuehelia is a pleurotoid genus of agaric fungi characterized by gelatinous-sheathed bowling-pin-shaped cystidia, on conidia, basidiospore germ tubes, and mycelium that adhere to and capture nematodes. The fruitbodies bear thick-walled cystidia (metuloids) in the hymenium along the gill sides and that differentiate the genus from Pleurotus in the Pleurotaceae family. The genus has a widespread distribution and contains about 50 species.

== Etymology ==
Named after — Ludwig Samuel Joseph David Alexander Freiherr von Hohenbühel Heufler zu Rasen und Perdonegg (1817-1885) - an Austrian baron and cryptogamist.

== Species ==
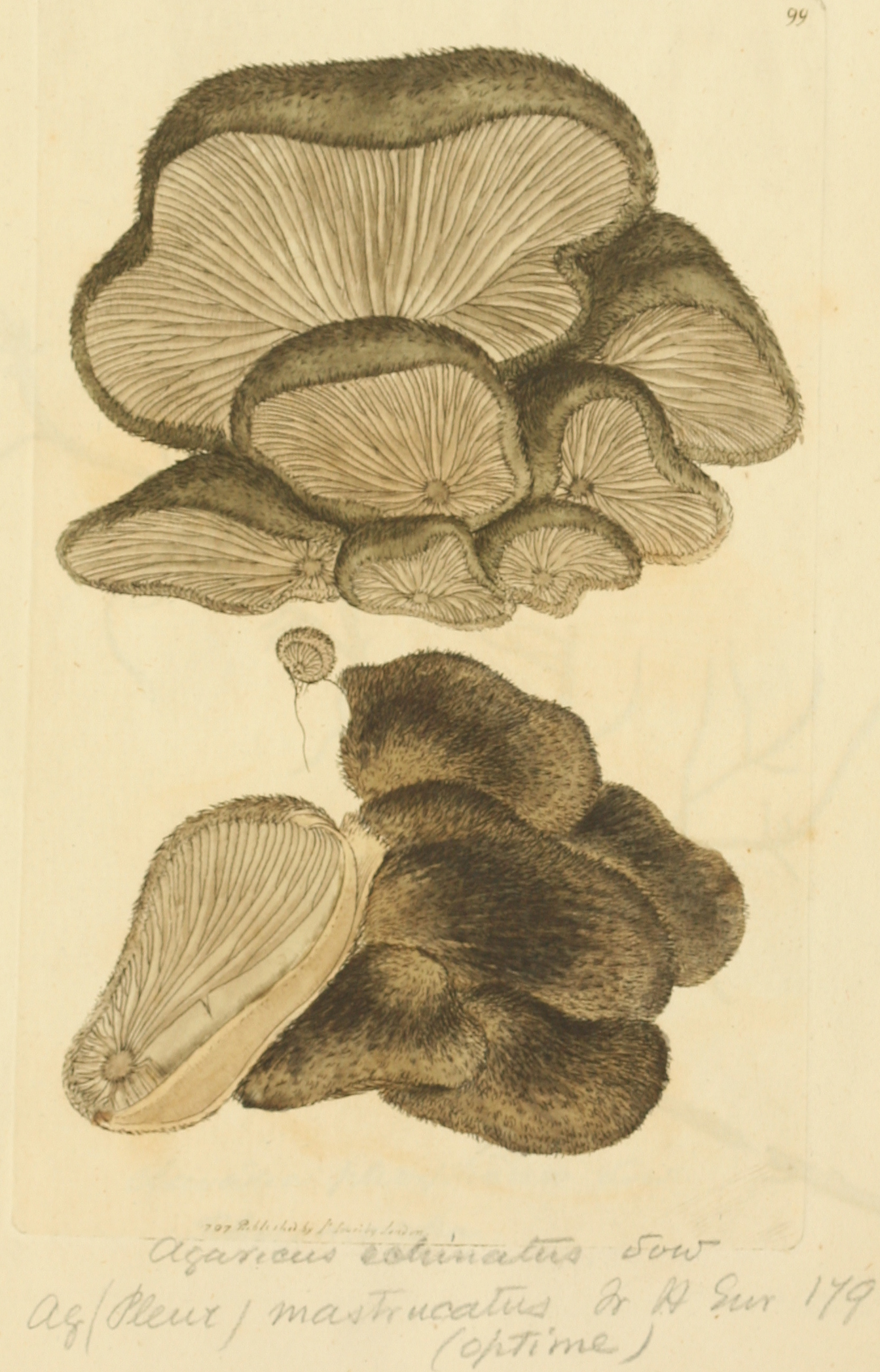
Hohenbuehelia mastrucata

- H. abietina
- H. aciculospora
- H. amazonica
- H. angustata
- H. approximans
- H. atrocoerulea
- H. aurantiocystis
- H. auriscalpium
- H. austrocedri
- H. barbatula
- H. brunnea
- H. campinaranae
- H. culmicola
- H. cyphelliformis
- H. delasotae
- H. elegans
- H. espeletiae
- H. fluxilis
- H. grisea
- H. heterosporica
- H. horakii
- H. hydrogeton
- H. inversa
- H. izonetae
- H. leightonii
- H. ligulata
- H. longipes
- H. luteola
- H. mastrucata
- H. metuloidea
- H. minutissima
- H. mustialaensis
- H. myxotricha
- H. nigra
- H. nothofaginea
- H. panelloides
- H. pergelatinosa
- H. petalodes
- H. petaloides
- H. phalligera
- H. pinacearum
- H. pinicola
- H. podocarpinea
- H. recedens
- H. reniformis
- H. sciadia
- H. silvana
- H. testudo
- H. tremula
- H. tropicalis
- H. unguicularis
