= 4-Aminoacridine =

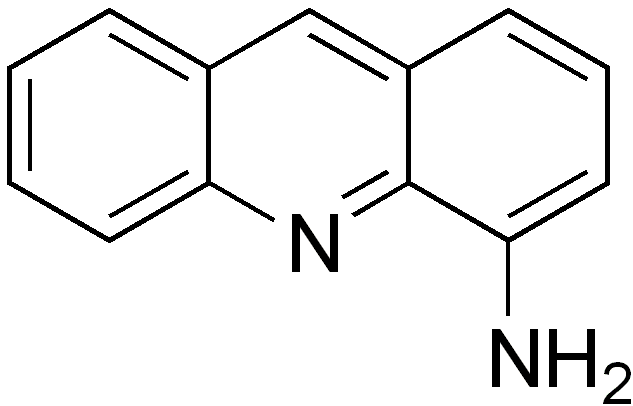

Names
- Preferred IUPAC name Acridin-4-amine

Identifiers
CAS Number	578-07-4
3D model (JSmol)	Interactive image; Interactive image
ChEMBL	ChEMBL147934
ChemSpider	21243528
PubChem CID	11353
UNII	16S346L1OM
CompTox Dashboard (EPA)	DTXSID80206487
- InChI: InChI=1S/C13H10N2/c14-11-6-3-5-10-8-9-4-1-2-7-12(9)15-13(10)11/h1-8H,14H2 Key: QWAGALBSTFENEE-UHFFFAOYSA-N; InChI=1/C13H10N2/c14-11-6-3-5-10-8-9-4-1-2-7-12(9)15-13(10)11/h1-8H,14H2 Key: QWAGALBSTFENEE-UHFFFAOYAY
- SMILES: C1=CC=C2C(=C1)C=C3C=CC=C(C3=N2)N; Nc2cccc1cc3ccccc3nc12

Properties
Chemical formula	C_{13}H_{10}N_{2}
Molar mass	194.23 g/mol
- Except where otherwise noted, data are given for materials in their standard state (at 25 °C [77 °F], 100 kPa). verify (what is ?) Infobox references

4-Aminoacridine is an aminoacridine.

== See also ==
- 2-Aminoacridine
- 3-Aminoacridine
- 9-Aminoacridine
