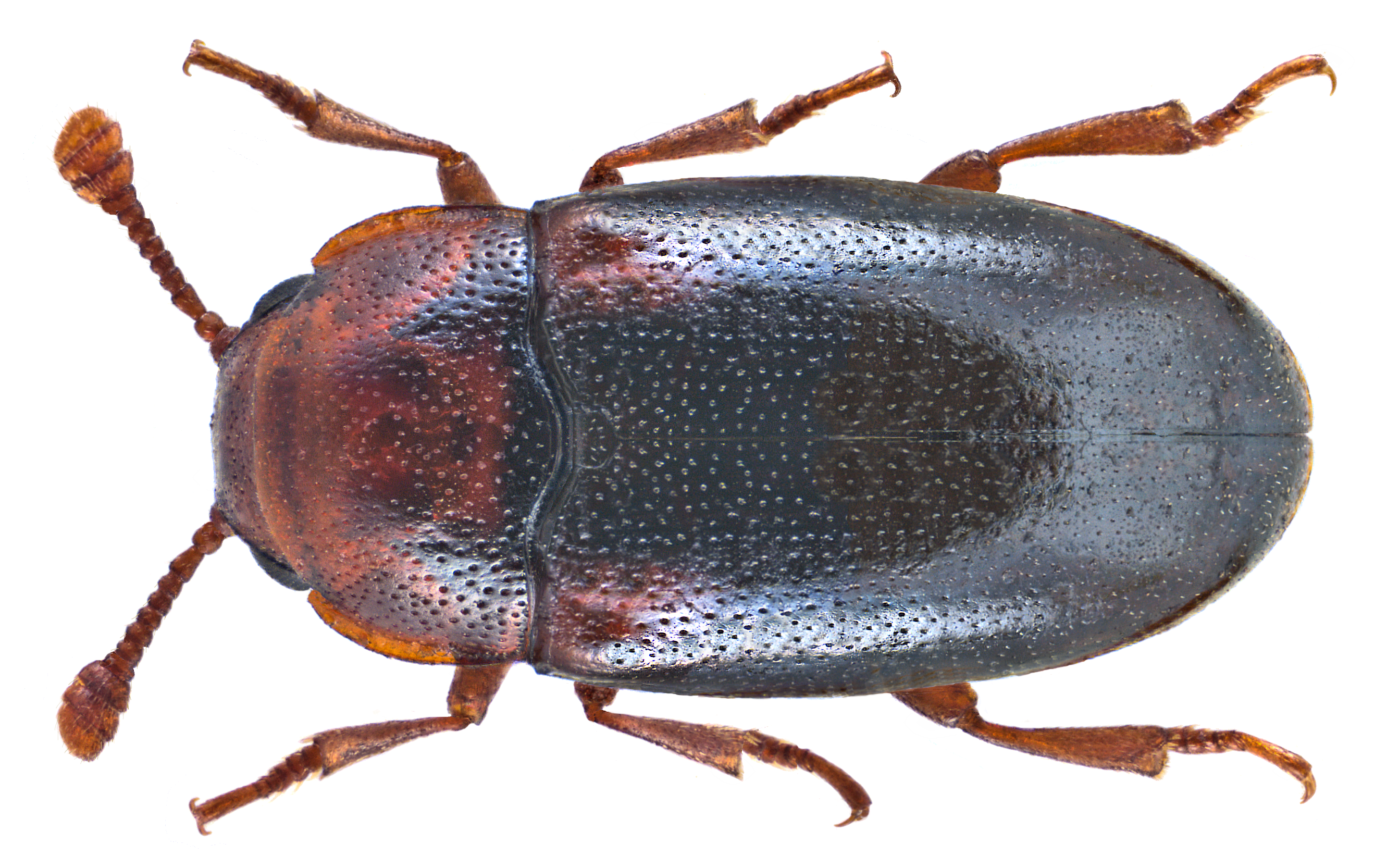
- Dacne bipustulata 2.8 mm (2.5-3.3 mm)

Scientific classification
- Kingdom: Animalia
- Phylum: Arthropoda
- Clade: Pancrustacea
- Class: Insecta
- Order: Coleoptera
- Suborder: Polyphaga
- Infraorder: Cucujiformia
- Family: Erotylidae
- Genus: Dacne
- Species: D. bipustulata

Binomial name
- Dacne bipustulata (Thunberg, 1781)

= Dacne bipustulata =

Species of beetle

Dacne bipustulata is a species of pleasing fungus beetles native to Europe.
