= N-Formylmorpholine =

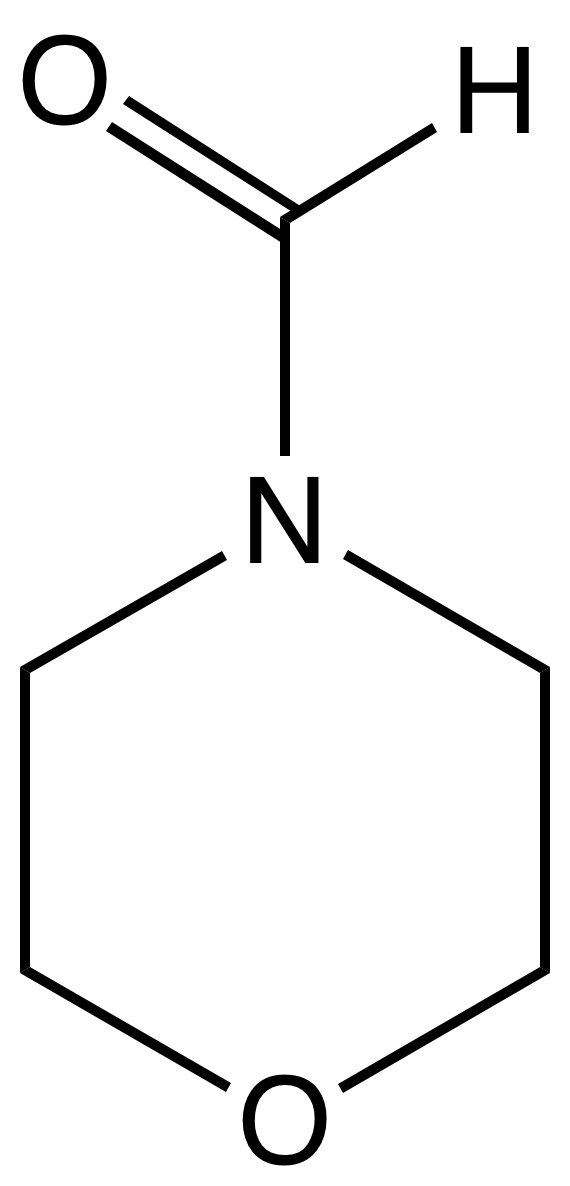

Names
- Preferred IUPAC name Morpholine-4-carbaldehyde
- Other names Formylmorpholine; 4-Morpholinecarboxaldehyde

Identifiers
CAS Number	4394-85-8
3D model (JSmol)	Interactive image
ChemSpider	19231
ECHA InfoCard	100.022.291
EC Number	224-518-3
PubChem CID	20417
UNII	D1E63XO4RH
CompTox Dashboard (EPA)	DTXSID7044427
- InChI: InChI=1S/C5H9NO2/c7-5-6-1-3-8-4-2-6/h5H,1-4H2 Key: LCEDQNDDFOCWGG-UHFFFAOYSA-N
- SMILES: C1COCCN1C=O

Properties
Chemical formula	C_{5}H_{9}NO_{2}
Molar mass	115.132 g·mol^{−1}
Appearance	Colorless or white solid
Density	1.145 gm/cm^{3} (26 °C)
Melting point	21 °C (70 °F; 294 K)
Boiling point	239 °C (462 °F; 512 K)

Hazards
- GHS labelling
Pictograms	(GHS07: Exclamation mark)
Signal word	Warning
Hazard statements	H317, H319, H335
Precautionary statements	P261, P264, P271, P272, P280, P302+P352, P304+P340, P305+P351+P338, P312, P321, P333+P313, P337+P313, P363, P403+P233, P405, P501
- Except where otherwise noted, data are given for materials in their standard state (at 25 °C [77 °F], 100 kPa). Infobox references

N-Formylmorpholine is the organic compound with the formula O(C_{2}H_{4})_{2}NCHO. It is the formamide of morpholine (O(C_{2}H_{4})_{2}NH). A colorless compound, it is a useful high temperature solvent akin to dimethylformamide. It has been used as a formylating agent.
