= Diazodiphenylmethane =

Names
- Preferred IUPAC name [Diazo(phenyl)methyl]benzene
- Other names Diazodiphenylmethane

Identifiers
CAS Number	883-40-9
3D model (JSmol)	Interactive image
ChemSpider	55172
MeSH	C480088
PubChem CID	61230
UNII	VG5TWB4MMS
CompTox Dashboard (EPA)	DTXSID80236941
- InChI: InChI=1S/C13H10N2/c14-15-13(11-7-3-1-4-8-11)12-9-5-2-6-10-12/h1-10H Key: ITLHXEGAYQFOHJ-UHFFFAOYSA-N
- SMILES: c1ccc(cc1)C(=[N+]=[N-])c2ccccc2

Properties
Chemical formula	C_{13}H_{10}N_{2}
Molar mass	194.237 g·mol^{−1}
Appearance	red-black solid
Melting point	30 °C (86 °F; 303 K)
Magnetic susceptibility (χ)	−115·10^{−6} cm^{3}·mol^{−1}

Hazards
- Occupational safety and health (OHS/OSH)
Main hazards	unstable
- Except where otherwise noted, data are given for materials in their standard state (at 25 °C [77 °F], 100 kPa). Infobox references

Diazodiphenylmethane is an organic reagent with the chemical formula C_{13}H_{10}N_{2}. It exists as red-black crystals that melt just above room temperature.

== Preparation ==
Diazodiphenylmethane can be synthesized via the oxidation of benzophenone hydrazone with mercury(II) oxide in diethyl ether and the presence of a basic catalyst. An improved procedure involves dehydrogenation with oxalyl chloride.

== Uses ==
Like all diazo compounds, diazodiphenylmethane is an alkylating agent, forming diphenylmethyl esters and ethers with carboxylic acids and alcohols, respectively.

When heated or illuminated with ultraviolet light, the compound decomposes, forming (diphenyl)methyl carbene and nitrogen gas. Electrolytic reduction in dimethylformamide with tetrabutylammonium perchlorate cosolute generates the Ph_{2}CN^{−}_{2} radical anion, which also loses N_{2}. The resulting Ph_{2}C^{−} radical anion can attack other molecules of diazodiphenylmethane to form benzophenone azine, which has the formula Ph_{2}C=N-N=CPh_{2}.
