= Nothopanus =

Scientific classification
- Domain: Eukaryota
- Kingdom: Fungi
- Division: Basidiomycota
- Class: Agaricomycetes
- Order: Agaricales
- Family: Marasmiaceae
- Genus: Nothopanus; Singer (1944)

Type species
- Nothopanus eugrammus (Mont.) Singer (1944)

Species
- N. eugrammus N. hygrophanus N. noctilucens N. nsimalenensis

Genus of fungi

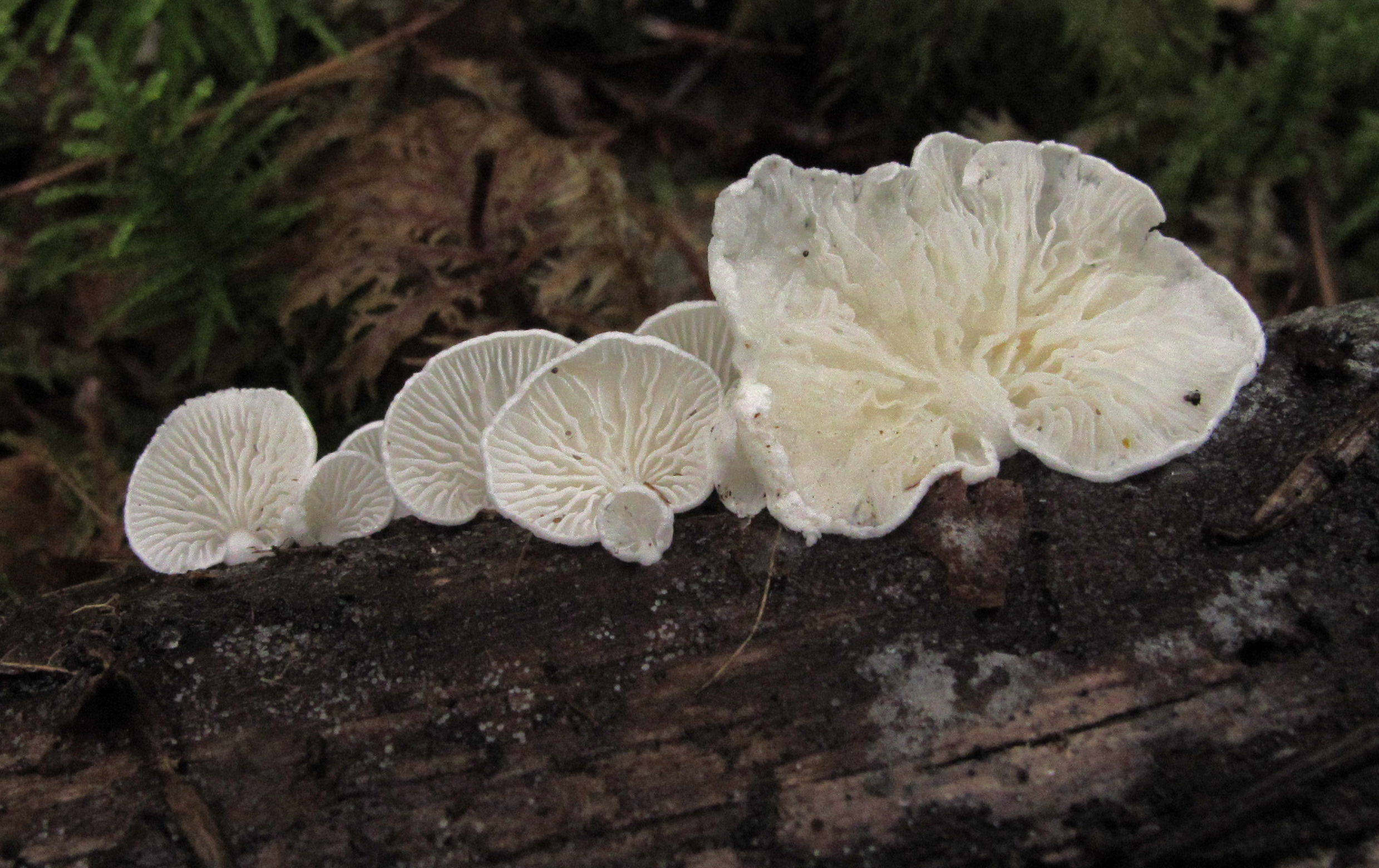

Nothopanus is a genus of fungus in the family Marasmiaceae. The genus was circumscribed by American mycologist Rolf Singer in 1944.

== See also ==
- List of Marasmiaceae genera
