= 9-Aminoacridine =

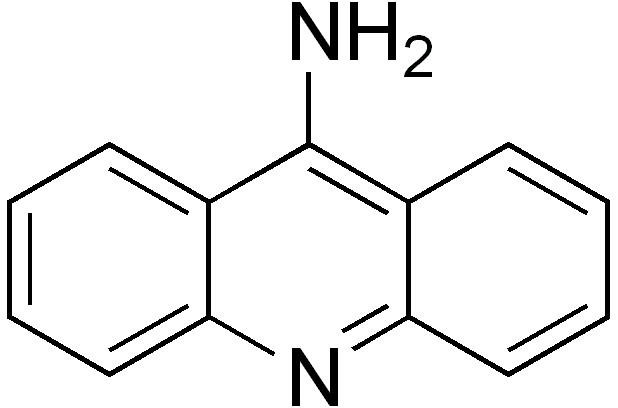

Names
- Preferred IUPAC name Acridin-9-amine
- Other names Aminacrine

Identifiers
CAS Number	90-45-9
3D model (JSmol)	Interactive image
ChEBI	CHEBI:74789
ChEMBL	ChEMBL43184
ChemSpider	6752
ECHA InfoCard	100.001.814
PubChem CID	7019
UNII	78OY3Z0P7Z
CompTox Dashboard (EPA)	DTXSID2024456
- InChI: InChI=1S/C13H10N2/c14-13-9-5-1-3-7-11(9)15-12-8-4-2-6-10(12)13/h1-8H,(H2,14,15) Key: XJGFWWJLMVZSIG-UHFFFAOYSA-N; InChI=1/C13H10N2/c14-13-9-5-1-3-7-11(9)15-12-8-4-2-6-10(12)13/h1-8H,(H2,14,15) Key: XJGFWWJLMVZSIG-UHFFFAOYAM
- SMILES: n1c3c(c(c2c1cccc2)N)cccc3

Properties
Chemical formula	C_{13}H_{10}N_{2}
Molar mass	194.237 g·mol^{−1}
Appearance	Yellow powder
Melting point	300 °C (572 °F; 573 K)

Pharmacology
ATC code	D08AA02 (WHO)
- Except where otherwise noted, data are given for materials in their standard state (at 25 °C [77 °F], 100 kPa). verify (what is ?) Infobox references

9-Aminoacridine is a synthetic dye used clinically as a topical antiseptic and experimentally as a mutagen, an intracellular pH indicator and a small molecule MALDI matrix.

== See also ==
- 2-Aminoacridine
- 3-Aminoacridine
- 4-Aminoacridine
