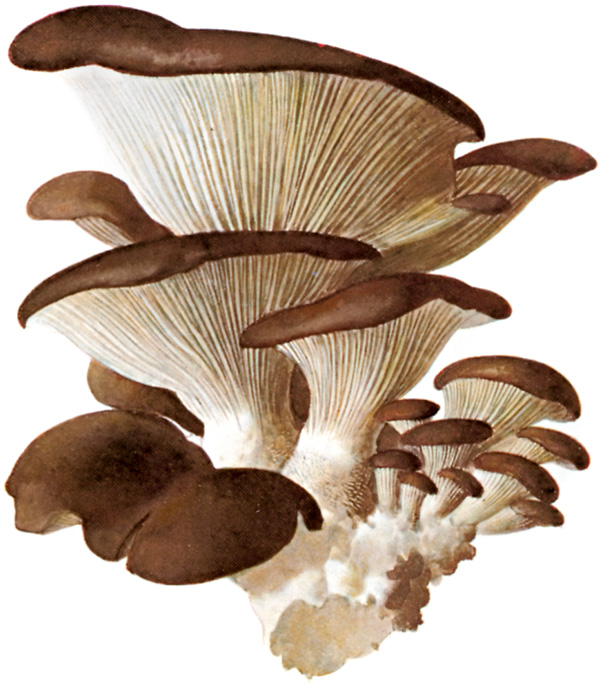
- Pleurotus ostreatus Albin Schmalfuß, 1897

Scientific classification
- Kingdom: Fungi
- Division: Basidiomycota
- Class: Agaricomycetes
- Order: Agaricales
- Family: Pleurotaceae; Kühner (1980)

Type genus
- Pleurotus (Fr.) P.Kumm. (1871)

Genera
- Acanthocystis; Agaricochaete; Antromycopsis; Geopetalum; Hohenbuehelia; Lignomyces; Nematoctonus; Nothopanus; Pleurotopsis; Pleurotus; Resupinatus; Rhodocyphella; Stigmatolemma

= Pleurotaceae =

Family of mushrooms

The Pleurotaceae are a family of small to medium-sized mushrooms which have white spores. The family contains 13 genera, with over 412 species. Members of Pleurotaceae can be mistaken for members of Marasmiaceae. Perhaps the best known member is the oyster mushroom, Pleurotus ostreatus.

Many species in the genera Pleurotus and Hohenbuehelia are nematophagous, that is, they derive nutrition by consuming nematodes. This is made possible by hyphae that may have adhesive knobs that attach to passing nematodes and secrete nematotoxic compounds.

== See also ==
- List of Agaricales families
