= Scullin =

Scullin may refer to:

In places:

- Scullin, Australian Capital Territory, a suburb of Canberra
- Division of Scullin, an electorate in the Australian House of Representatives

People with the surname Scullin:

- James Scullin (1876–1953), Prime Minister of Australia
- Frederick Scullin (born 1939), American judge
- Matthew L. Scullin (born 1983), American scientist

== See also ==
- Scullin Monolith, rock outcrop in Antarctica
- Scullin Ministry, ministry of Australia, 1929–1932
