= MycoWorks =

Startup company based in Emeryville, California

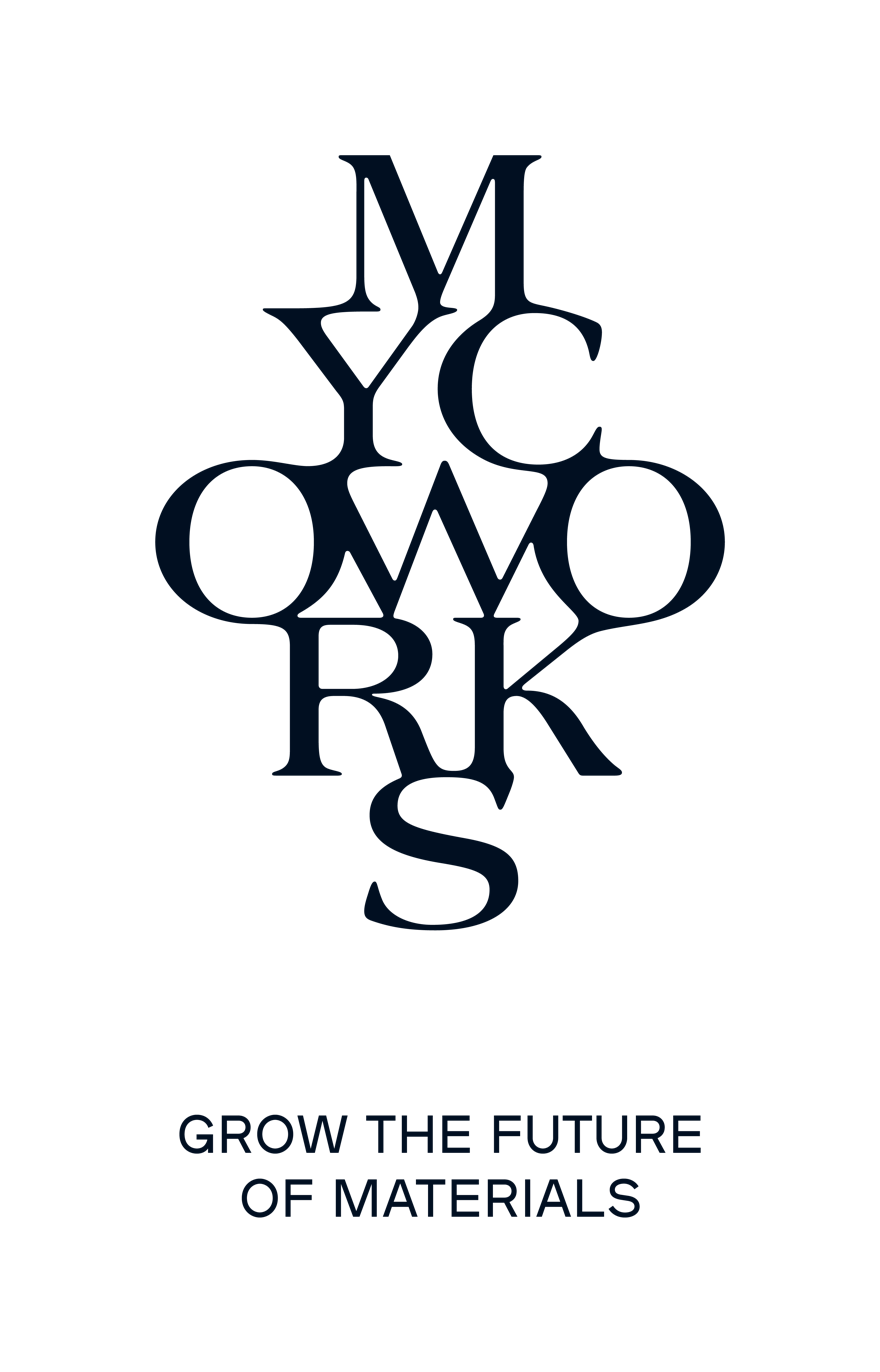
- Company type: Private
- Industry: Biotechnology, Materials Science, Fashion
- Founders: Phil Ross (Co-founder and Chief Technical Officer); Sophia Wang (Co-founder and Chief of Culture); Eddie Pavlu (Co-founder)
- Headquarters: Emeryville, California, United States
- Key people: Daniel Frydenlund (Bought MycoWorks in 2026); Matthew Scullin (Previous CEO, 2017-2025)
- Products: Fine Mycelium, Reishi
- Website: www.mycoworks.com

MycoWorks was a biotechnology company based in Emeryville, California that produced leather-like products using a process involving mycelium. The company was founded in 2013 by Philip Ross, Sophia Wang, and Eddie Pavlu. The company became insolvent in late October 2025, and was liquidated via an Assignment for the Benefit of Creditors process (ABC). MycoWork's intellectual property assets were sold to Daniel Frydenlund of Stage Fund, a Denver-based private equity fund, which formed a new company, MycoWorks Denver, LLC., in 2026.

== History ==
Co-founder and former Chief Technical Officer Phil Ross's work with mycelium began before the formation of the company, which assisted in the company's developments. In 2017, Matthew L. Scullin signed on as Chief Executive Officer. In early 2020, the company raised Series A financing, and, later that year, $45 million in Series B financing with Natalie Portman and John Legend participating.

In October 2023, MycoWorks opened a 136,000 square foot facility in South Carolina, including manufacturing operations and corporate offices, and providing approximately 400 jobs. MycoWorks' factory, producing Reishi, operated at 22% of its capacity threshold. The slow uptake by the industry resulted in a failed tax-exempt bond offering from the company. In October 2025, the South Carolina factory was shut down completely, having been active for two years.

== Technology ==
Fine Mycelium is a patented technology by MycoWorks that attempts to influence cellular structures for increased strength and durability. The company used the term to refer to both their process and the resulting materials intended for the fashion, footwear, automotive, and decor industries. As of October 2025, MycoWorks' production of Reishi with Fine Mycelium technology has ended.

== Products ==
Reishi was the first commercially available product from MycoWorks, followed by Reishi Doux, Reishi Natural, and Reishi Pebble in 2023. The product was used in a number of luxury retail items such as handbags and hats. Commercial-scale manufacturing began in October 2023 at a plant in Union, South Carolina. In October 2025, the South Carolina factory was shut down completely, having been active for two years. In November 2025, MycoWorks' original Emeryville location, with pilot plant and company headquarters, was also permanently shut down.

== See also ==
- Ecovative Design – American construction materials manufacturer
