= Alphabet Energy =

American thermoelectric generator company

Alphabet Energy, Inc.
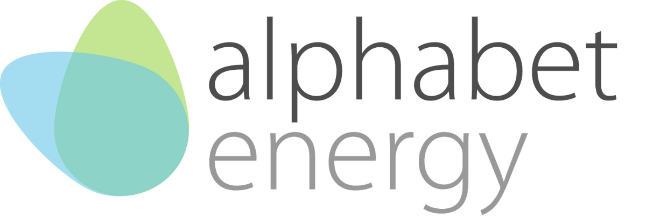
- Company type: Private
- Founded: December 29, 2008; 17 years ago
- Defunct: August 1, 2018
- Headquarters: Hayward, California, U.S.
- Key people: Matthew L. Scullin (CEO and co-founder)
- Products: Thermoelectric generators
- Number of employees: 35
- Website: www.alphabetenergy.com

Alphabet Energy was a startup company founded in 2009 at the University of California, Berkeley by thermoelectrics expert Matthew L. Scullin and Peidong Yang. The company uses nanotechnology and materials science applications to create thermoelectric generators that are more cost effective than previous bismuth telluride-based devices. The company is based in Hayward, California. It started with a license to use silicon nanowire developed at Lawrence Berkeley National Laboratory. They moved from UC Berkeley to offices in San Francisco in 2011, and later to Hayward.

Alphabet has a number of patents related to the capture of waste heat for purposes of electricity generation. The company is working with tetrahedrite, a common mineral with thermoelectric properties.

2011's The Lean Startup: How Today's Entrepreneurs Use Continuous Innovation to Create Radically Successful Businesses describes Alphabet Energy's approach to product development as an example of the successful practice of the book's principles. Author Eric Ries is on Alphabet's advisory board.

Alphabet has raised over $35 million in venture capital funding from Claremont Creek, TPG Capital, Encana and the California Clean Energy Fund. They were chosen as a 2014 World Economic Forum Technology Pioneer and as a 2015 IHS CERAWeek Energy Innovation Pioneer. In 2016, Schlumberger Ltd. led a $23.5 million round to help the company expand production of its Power Generating Combustor (PGC) system, which helps to reduce the impact of natural gas flaring. Alphabet, whose investors also have included Encana Corp., said Schlumberger participated with GM Ventures, and others.

Alphabet Energy ceased operation on 2018 Aug. 1st, and was sold to Synergy Fuels.

The company's name, based on the word alpha, comes from its use as a term for a Seebeck coefficient, and has no relation to the Google holding company, Alphabet Inc., as it was founded before Google adopted the Alphabet moniker.

== Products ==
In 2014, Alphabet Energy introduced the world's first industrial-scale thermoelectric generator, the E1. The E1 takes exhaust heat from large industrial engines and turns it into electricity. The result is an engine that needs less fuel to deliver the same power. The E1 is optimized for engines up to 1,400 kW, and works on any engine or exhaust source, currently generating up to 25 kWe on a standard 1,000 kW engine. The E1's modules are interchangeable but currently come with a low-cost proprietary thermoelectric material and the device is rated for a 10-year life span. As advances in thermoelectric materials are made, new modules can be swapped in for old ones, to continually improve fuel efficiency to as much as 10%.

Later on, the company introduced what would become its flagship product, the Power Generating Combustor (PGC). The PGC system is designed to eliminate the need for diesel- and natural gas-powered generators and electrical grid connections at oil and gas well pads to reduce fuel, rental and maintenance costs, and to eliminate emissions. Alphabet opened a Houston office to keep pace with energy industry demand for remote power generation solutions.

== High temperature heat-to-electricity conversion ==
In 2017 Alphabet Energy, with a $2-million grant from the California Energy Commission (CEC), has been partnering with Berkeley Lab "to create a cost-effective thermoelectric waste heat recovery system to reduce both energy use in the industrial sector and electricity-related carbon emissions." The goal is a prototype with 10+ percent efficiency, operating temperatures beyond the 400 degree Celsius limit up to 800 degrees, possible remote electricity generation for areas off the grid, and "modularization for a broad scale of..applications" unique at various locations.
