= Peidong Yang =

American chemist

- 杨培东
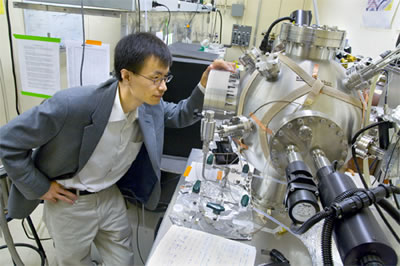
- Born: 1971 (age 54–55); Suzhou, China
- Education: University of Science and Technology of China (BS); Harvard University (PhD)
- Known for: Nanotechnology
- Scientific career
- Fields: Chemistry
- Workplaces: UC Berkeley
- Doctoral advisor: Charles M. Lieber
- Other academic advisors: Galen D. Stucky

Peidong Yang (simplified Chinese: 杨培东; traditional Chinese: 楊培東; pinyin: Yáng Peídōng; born 1971) is a Chinese-American chemist, material scientist, and businessman. He is the S.K. and Angela Chan Distinguished Professor of Energy, as well as a Professor of Chemistry and a Professor of Materials Science at the University of California, Berkeley (UC Berkeley). He is also a Senior Faculty Scientist at the Materials and Chemical Sciences Division at the Lawrence Berkeley National Laboratory, the Director of the California Research Alliance by BASF and the Director of the Kavli Energy Nanoscience Institute at UC Berkeley.

Peidong Yang Group studies semiconductor nanowires and other nanostructures and their electronic, optical, and catalytic properties. Previously, he served as the Department Head at the Joint Center for Artificial Photosynthesis (JCAP) and Deputy Director of the Center of Integrated Nanomechanical Systems (COINS). He is a member of the National Academy of Sciences (NAS) and the American Academy of Arts and Sciences and a foreign member of the Chinese Academy of Sciences (CAS).

Yang's contributions to nanotechnology include the invention of the first nanowire nanolaser in 2001, the development of a sub-5 nm gate-all-around (GAA) nanowire transistor architecture in 2005, and the introduction of the first synthetic biophotonic leaf in 2015.

In 2015, Yang was named a MacArthur Genius Fellow, and was invited by then-President Obama to present at the White House Frontier Conference in 2016. Additionally, he serves as an Executive Editor of the Journal of the American Chemical Society.

== Education ==
Yang received a B.S. in chemistry from the University of Science and Technology of China in 1993. For his graduate studies, he worked with Charles M. Lieber at Harvard University, and in 1997, he was awarded a Ph.D. in chemistry. He was a post-doctoral fellow with Galen D. Stucky at University of California, Santa Barbara from 1997 to 1999, until being hired as an assistant professor in chemistry at UC Berkeley.

== Career ==
In the early 1990s, Yang, while still a graduate student in Charles Lieber's Lab at Harvard University, started to investigate flux line pinning in high T_{c} superconductors using nanowires as pinning centers. The approach was to introduce single-crystalline oxide nanowires into a high-T_{c} superconductor, to make a composite to create stable nanoscopic linear tracks, and to increase the critical current density by "pinning" the flux lines. This oxide nanowire synthesis marked the start of both Lieber's group and global nanowire research.

Yang is known for his work in semiconductor nanowire and nanostructure synthesis and characterization, having co-authored over 400 peer-reviewed journal articles, including the paper titled "Room-Temperature Ultraviolet Nanowire Nanolasers," published in Science in 2001, which has received over 11,000 citations. In 2010, he was ranked as the top materials scientist and among the top 10 chemists of the 2000-2010 decade by Thomson Reuters, based on citation impact. Later, as one of the founders of the semiconductor nanowire research field, he was named a Clarivate Citation Laureate in Physics in 2014.

In 2005, Yang introduced for the first time a surrounding gate sub-5nm nanowire field-effect transistor architecture with excellent subthreshold behavior and gate coupling and energy efficiency. In the same year, his team demonstrated the first functional p-, n-, and ambipolar ionic nanofluidic circuitry, where ion transport could be electrically gated like traditional field-effect transistors for electrons, a work with implications for seawater desalination and salinity gradient energy harvesting.

In the 1990s, Mildred Dresselhaus predicted that tailoring the diameters, compositions, and carrier concentrations of thin nanowires could enhance thermoelectric performance by impeding phonon transport through boundary scattering and phonon confinement.

Yang and his colleague Arun Majumdar were the first to demonstrate experimentally that silicon nanowires exhibit size-dependent thermal conductivities, validating this early prediction. He later discovered that silicon nanowires with rough surfaces and 50 nm diameters exhibit a 100-fold reduction in thermal conductivity, achieving zT~0.6 at room temperature, a technology later commercialized by Alphabet Energy, which explored its potential for waste heat recovery and greenhouse gas reduction.

In 2015, Yang and his team developed a synthetic biophotonic "leaf," a hybrid system of semiconducting nanowires and the bacteria S. Ovata, where the nanowires captured sunlight and the bacteria facilitated the conversion of carbon dioxide and water into a targeted carbon-based chemical, such as butanol, through the photosynthetic process. This marked the first fully integrated system designed to produce value-added chemicals directly from CO_{2}, H_{2}O, and sunlight. In 2024, he revised the nanowire biophotochemical system design, enabling bias-free CO_{2} fixation with a high current density under red light irradiation. This new design allowed the operation of such biophotochemical diodes 24/7, eliminating the dependence on intermittent sunlight irradiation.

As a co-leader of the JCAP, Yang contributed to the establishment of the JCAP energy hub and has led efforts to develop materials that use sunlight to convert carbon dioxide into fuel.

Yang coined the term "Liquid Sunlight" to describe a new form of chemical energy stored in chemical bonds derived from solar energy, a concept now used in national research initiatives in Europe and Asia, as well as the DOE energy hub, the Liquid Sunlight Alliance (LiSA).

=== Business ventures ===
Yang co-founded Alphabet Energy with Matthew L. Scullin and was also a founding member of the scientific advisory board at Nanosys, a nanomaterials company whose nanowire technologies were acquired by OneD Battery Sciences in 2013. OneD Materials manufactures silicon nanowires at scale for battery makers, utilizing a scaled-up CVD system to produce nanowire-based composites with 340 MWh anode capacity.

Since 1999, Yang has been the inventor of several fundamental nanowire IPs covering a range of nanowire structures for energy applications, including US Patent No. 9,881,999, US 7,569,941, US 7,569,847, US 6,996,147, US 6,882,051, US 5,897,945, and US 7,834,264.

== Awards and honors ==
- 1999 – Camille Dreyfus Teacher-Scholar Award, The Camille and Henry Dreyfus Foundation
- 2000 – 3M Untenured Faculty Award, 3M
- 2001 – Sloan Research Fellowship, Alfred P. Sloan Foundation
- 2001 – CAREER Award, National Science Foundation (NSF)
- 2001 – Hellman Family Faculty Award, UC Berkeley
- 2002 – Beckman Young Investigators Award, Arnold and Mabel Beckman Foundation
- 2003 – Innovators Under 35, MIT Technology Review magazine
- 2004 – Camille Dreyfus Teacher-Scholar Award, The Camille and Henry Dreyfus Foundation
- 2004 – DuPont Young Professor Award, DuPont
- 2004 – Julius Springer Prize, Springer
- 2004 – Outstanding Young Investigator Award, Materials Research Society
- 2005 – ACS Award in Pure Chemistry, American Chemical Society (ACS)
- 2007 – Alan T. Waterman Award, NSF
- 2008 – Scientific American 50 Award, Scientific American
- 2008 – Miller Research Professorship, Miller Institute for Basic Research in Science
- 2015 – MacArthur "Genius" Fellow, MacArthur Foundation
- 2016 – Member, NAS
- 2016 – Invited Speaker, White House Frontier Conference
- 2016 – Distinguished Visiting Fellowship, Royal Academy of Engineering
- 2020 – Fellow, American Association for the Advancement of Science
- 2020 – Global Energy Prize, The Global Energy Association
- 2021 – Foreign Member, CAS

== Personal life ==
Yang lives with his wife, Mei, and their daughter, Rachel.
