= Microbial art =

Painting using microbe cultures

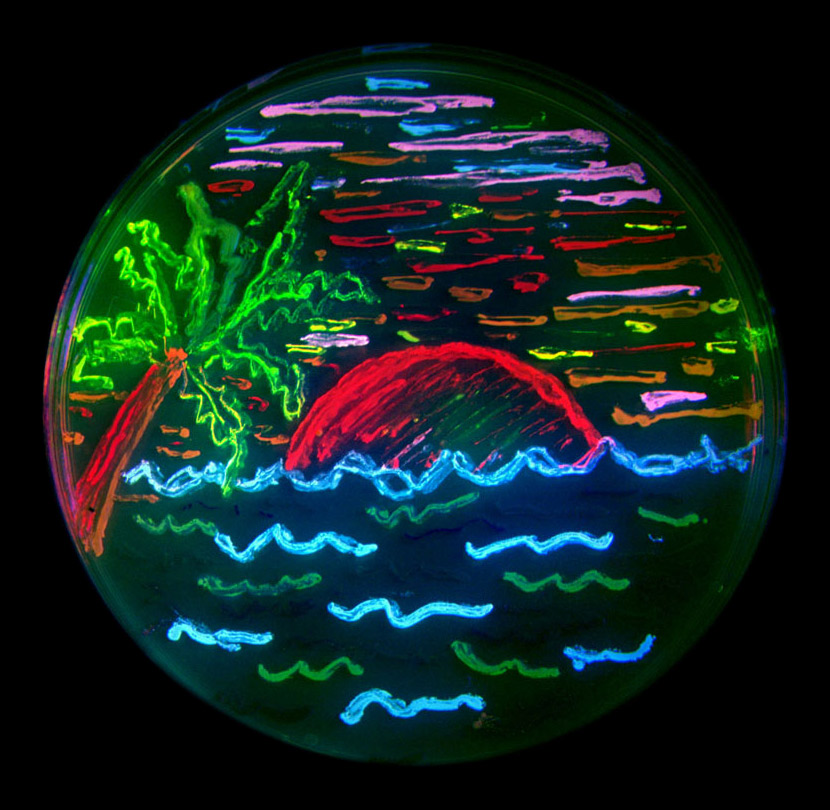
Beach scene with bacterial strains expressing different kinds of fluorescent protein, from the laboratory of the Nobel Prize-winning biochemist Roger Y. Tsien

Microbial art, agar art, or germ art is artwork created by culturing microorganisms in certain patterns. The microbes used can be bacteria, yeast, fungi, or less commonly, protists. The microbes can be chosen for their natural colours or engineered to express fluorescent proteins and viewed under ultraviolet light to make them fluoresce in colour.

== Methods ==
Agar plates are used as a canvas, while pigmented or fluorescent bacteria and yeasts represent paint. In order to preserve a piece of microbial art after a sufficient incubation, the microbe culture is sealed with epoxy.

Microbe species can be artistically chosen for their natural colours to form a palette. Suitable species of bacteria (with their colours) include Bacillus subtilis (cream to brown), Chromobacterium violaceum (violet), Escherichia coli (colourless), Micrococcus luteus (yellow), Micrococcus roseus (pink), Proteus mirabilis, Pseudomonas aeruginosa (brown), Pseudomonas fluorescens (naturally blue-green fluorescent with pyoverdine), Serratia marcescens (pink or orange), Staphylococcus aureus (yellow), and Vibrio fischeri (bioluminescent).

Yeast species – which are fungi – used in microbial art include Saccharomyces cerevisiae (yellow–white) Aspergillus flavus (yellow–green spores), Aspergillus ochraceus (yellow), Aureobasidium pullulans (black), Candida albicans (whitish buff), Candida sake, Candida sp. (whitish), Cladosporium herbarum (brown to black), Cladosporium resinae, Epicoccum nigrum (yellow, orange, red, brown, and black), Fusarium sp., Rhodotorula sp., and Scopulariopsis brevicaulis. (Note: The colour shown by the micro-organisms also depends on the medium used.)

Protist species used in microbial art include Euglena gracilis (photosynthetic, green) and Physarum polycephalum (yellow–green).

A technique called "bacteriography" involves selectively killing certain areas of a bacterial culture with radiation in order to produce artistic patterns. After incubation, the culture is sealed with acrylic.

The type of medium in the agar plates is also important. Chromagar Candida is a differential medium used to identify different Candida species. When grown on this medium, C. albicans is light green, C. tropicalis is steel blue with purple around the edges, and C. krusei is rose pink with white around the edges. However, using a different medium, C. tropicalis has maroon colonies. The color of the medium itself can also be changed using microbes. In TCBS agar, Bromothymol Blue and Thymol Blue turn yellow when pH decreases, such as when bacteria consume sucrose. In this way, the background color of the medium can be changed from dark green to light yellow.

== Artists ==
Alexander Fleming, who is commonly credited with the discovery of penicillin in 1928, was known for creating germ paintings. Throughout his career, Fleming’s paintings became more colorful as he came to know more microbial species. He would incorporate them into his paintings of ballerinas, families, and other images.

The biochemist Roger Tsien won the 2008 Nobel Prize in Chemistry for his contributions to knowledge of green fluorescent protein (GFP) that has been used to create art-like works.

== Agar Art Competition ==
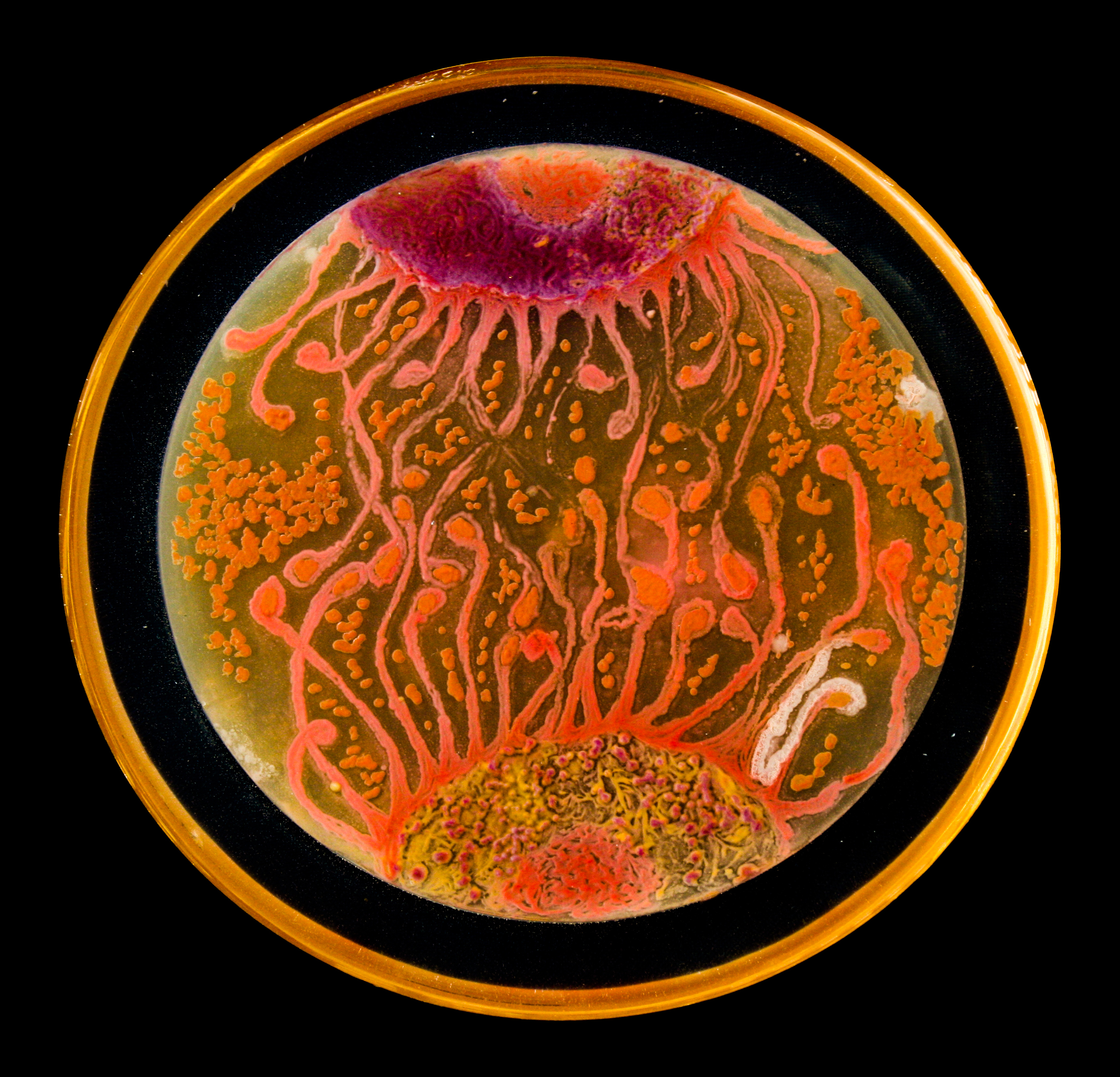
Cell to Cell, winner of 2015 ASM Agar Art Competition (by Mehmet Berkmen and Maria Peñil)

The American Society for Microbiology hosts an annual contest for microbial art: the Agar Art Contest. The contest was organized after a picture from a Christmas tree, made by Rositsa Tashkova, went viral in 2014. The 2015 edition covered 85 submissions, of which microbial art created by Mehmet Berkmen and Maria Peñil called Neurons won first place. The artwork used yellow Nesterenkonia and orange Deinococcus and Sphingomonas.

In 2020, the ASM received over 200 submissions, and awarded first place to Joanne Dungo for her multi-plate creation titled "The Gardener."

== See also ==
- Bioart
- Microbes in human culture
- Fungi in art
