= Nanofluidics =

Dynamics of fluids confined in nanoscale structures

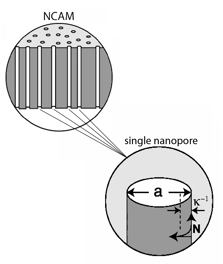
Schematic diagram of one particular realization of nanofluidics in a nanocapillary array membrane, or NCAM. The NCAM is composed of a large number of parallel nanocapillaries, each of which have a pore radius, a/2, which is approximately the same size as the Debye length, κ^{−1}. The electrical double layer is characterized by a counter-ion distribution, N, which is largest at the pore wall and decays toward the center of the pore.

Nanofluidics is the study of the behavior, manipulation, and control of fluids that are confined to structures of nanometer (typically 1–100 nm) characteristic dimensions (1 nm = 10^{−9} m). Fluids confined in these structures exhibit physical behaviors not observed in larger structures, such as those of micrometer dimensions and above, because the characteristic physical scaling lengths of the fluid, (e.g. Debye length, hydrodynamic radius) very closely coincide with the dimensions of the nanostructure itself. There is also Angstromfluidics (Å = 10⁻¹⁰ m = 0.1 nm), which is an emerging domain currently.

When structures approach the size regime corresponding to molecular scaling lengths, new physical constraints are placed on the behavior of the fluid. For example, these physical constraints induce regions of the fluid to exhibit new properties not observed in bulk, e.g. vastly increased viscosity near the pore wall; they may effect changes in thermodynamic properties and may also alter the chemical reactivity of species at the fluid-solid interface. A particularly relevant and useful example is displayed by electrolyte solutions confined in nanopores that contain surface charges, i.e. at electrified interfaces, as shown in the nanocapillary array membrane (NCAM) in the accompanying figure.

All electrified interfaces induce an organized charge distribution near the surface known as the electrical double layer. In pores of nanometer dimensions the electrical double layer may completely span the width of the nanopore, resulting in dramatic changes in the composition of the fluid and the related properties of fluid motion in the structure. For example, the drastically enhanced surface-to-volume ratio of the pore results in a preponderance of counter-ions (i.e. ions charged oppositely to the static wall charges) over co-ions (possessing the same sign as the wall charges), in many cases to the near-complete exclusion of co-ions, such that only one ionic species exists in the pore. This can be used for manipulation of species with selective polarity along the pore length to achieve unusual fluidic manipulation schemes not possible in micrometer and larger structures.

== Theory ==
In 1965, Rice and Whitehead published the seminal contribution to the theory of the transport of electrolyte solutions in long (ideally infinite) nanometer-diameter capillaries. Briefly, the potential, ϕ, at a radial distance, r, is given by the Poisson-Boltzmann equation,

$$\frac{1}{r}\frac{d}{dr}\left (r \frac{d\phi}{dr} \right )= \kappa^2 \phi,$$

where κ is the inverse Debye length,

$$\kappa = \sqrt{\frac{8\pi n e^2}{\epsilon k T}},$$

determined by the ion number density, n, the dielectric constant, ε, the Boltzmann constant, k, and the temperature, T. Knowing the potential, φ(r), the charge density can then be recovered from the Poisson equation, whose solution may be expressed as a modified Bessel function of the first kind, I_{0}, and scaled to the capillary radius, a. An equation of motion under combined pressure and electrically-driven flow can then be written,

$$\frac{1}{r} \frac{d}{dr} \left (r \frac{d v_z}{dr} \right )= \frac{1}{\eta} \frac{dp}{dz} - \frac{F_z}{\eta},$$

where η is the viscosity, dp/dz is the pressure gradient, and F_{z} is the body force driven by the action of the applied electric field, E_{z}, on the net charge density in the double layer. When there is no applied pressure, the radial distribution of the velocity is given by,

$$v_z\left (r \right) = \frac{\epsilon \phi_0}{4 \pi \eta} E_z \left [ 1 - \frac {I_0 \left ( \kappa r \right )} {I_0 \left ( \kappa a \right )} \right ].$$

From the equation above, it follows that fluid flow in nanocapillaries is governed by the κa product, that is, the relative sizes of the Debye length and the pore radius. By adjusting these two parameters and the surface charge density of the nanopores, fluid flow can be manipulated as desired.

== Fabrication ==
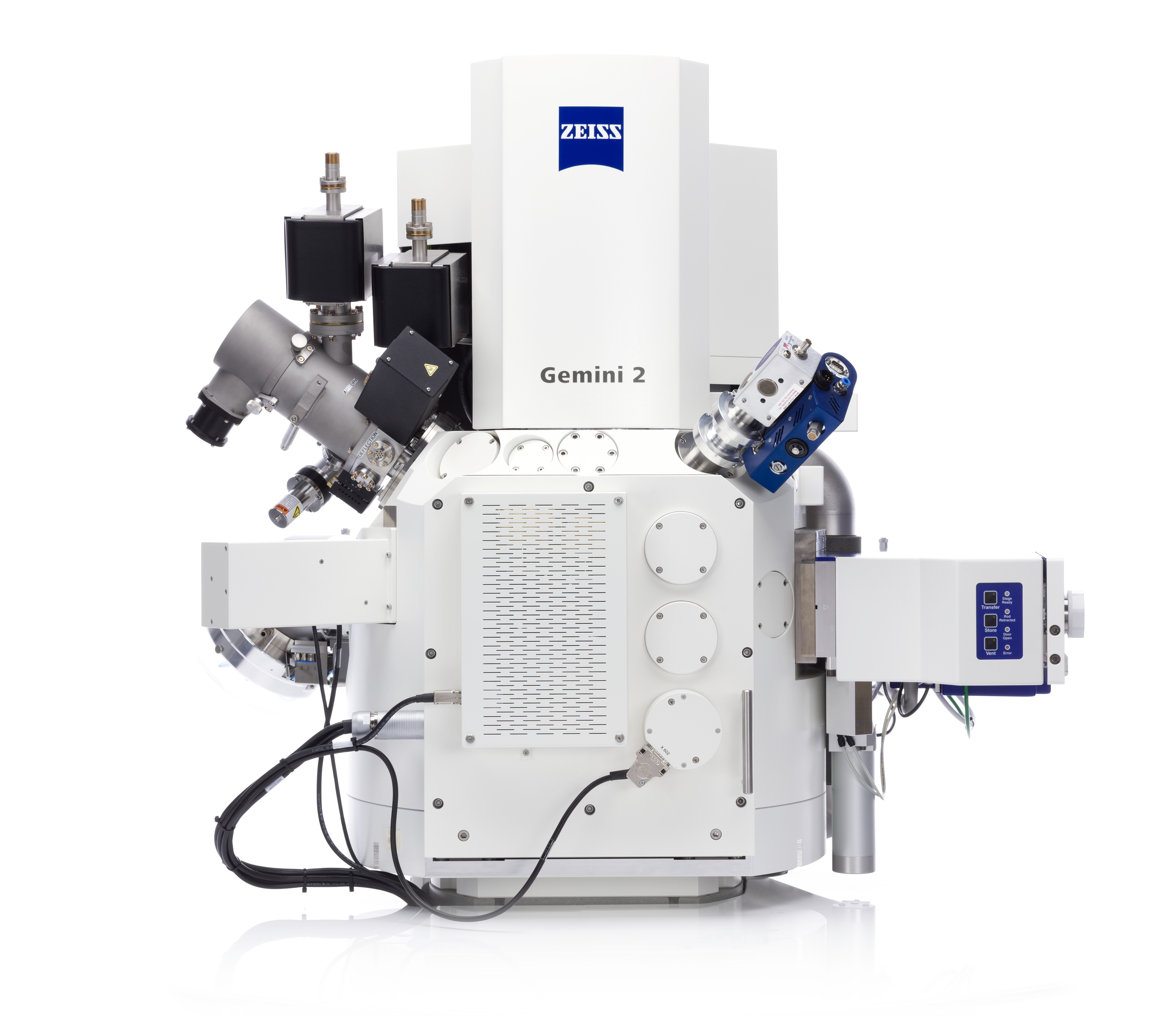
Carl Zeiss Crossbeam 550 - combines a field emission scanning electron microscope (FE-SEM) with a focused ion beam (FIB).

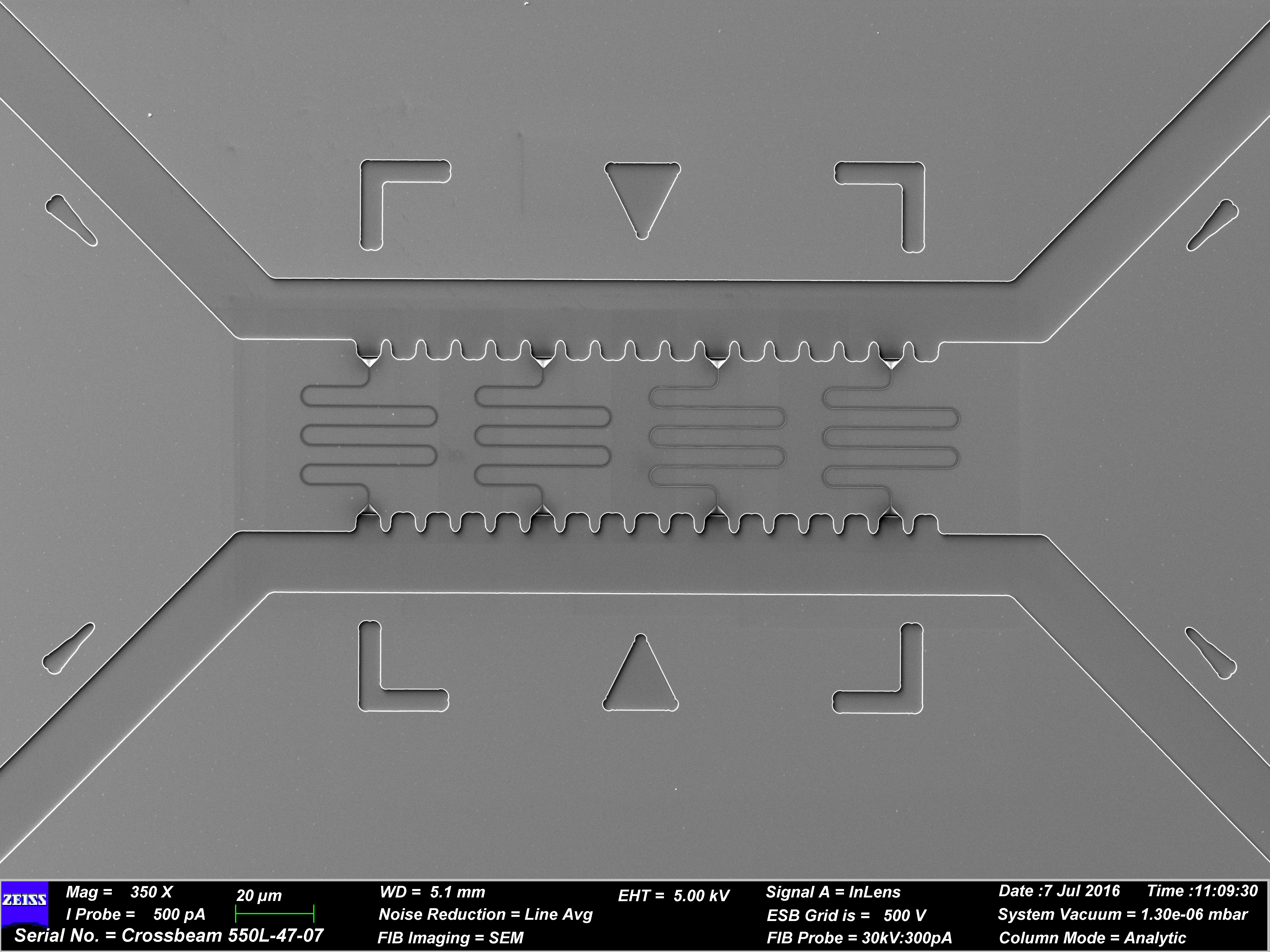
Nanofluidic channels fabricated with a Zeiss Crossbeam 550 L, in a silicon master stamp

Nanostructures can be fabricated as single cylindrical channels, nanoslits, or nanochannel arrays from materials such as silicon, glass, polymers (e.g. PMMA, PDMS, PCTE) and synthetic vesicles. Standard photolithography, bulk or surface micromachining, replication techniques (embossing, printing, casting and injection molding), and nuclear track or chemical etching, are commonly used to fabricate structures which exhibit characteristic nanofluidic behavior.

== Applications ==
Because of the small size of the fluidic conduits, nanofluidic structures are naturally applied in situations demanding that samples be handled in exceedingly small quantities, including Coulter counting, analytical separations and determinations of biomolecules ( proteins and DNA,), their topology studies, and facile handling of mass-limited samples. One of the more promising areas of nanofluidics is its potential for integration into microfluidic systems, i.e. micrototal analytical systems or lab-on-a-chip structures. For instance, NCAMs, when incorporated into microfluidic devices, can reproducibly perform digital switching, allowing transfer of fluid from one microfluidic channel to another, selectivity separate and transfer analytes by size and mass, mix reactants efficiently, and separate fluids with disparate characteristics. In addition, there is a natural analogy between the fluid handling capabilities of nanofluidic structures and the ability of electronic components to control the flow of electrons and holes. This analogy has been used to realize active electronic functions such as rectification and field-effect and bipolar transistor action with ionic currents. Application of nanofluidics is also to nano-optics for producing tuneable microlens array

Nanofluidics have had a significant impact in biotechnology, medicine and clinical diagnostics with the development of lab-on-a-chip devices for PCR and related techniques. Attempts have been made to understand the behaviour of flowfields around nanoparticles in terms of fluid forces as a function of Reynolds and Knudsen number using computational fluid dynamics. The relationship between lift, drag and Reynolds number has been shown to differ dramatically at the nanoscale compared with macroscale fluid dynamics.

== Challenges ==
There are a variety of challenges associated with the flow of liquids through carbon nanotubes and nanopipes. A common occurrence is channel blocking due to large macromolecules in the liquid. Also, any insoluble debris in the liquid can easily clog the tube. A solution for this researchers are hoping to find is a low friction coating or channel materials that help reduce the blocking of the tubes. Also, large polymers, including biologically relevant molecules such as DNA, often fold in vivo, causing blockages. Typical DNA molecules from a virus have lengths of approx. 100–200 kilobases and will form a random coil of the radius some 700 nm in aqueous solution at 20%. This is also several times greater than the pore diameter of even large carbon pipes and two orders of magnitude the diameter of a single walled carbon nanotube.

== See also ==
- Nanomechanics
- Nanotechnology
- Microfluidics
- Nanofluidic circuitry
