= Matthew L. Scullin =

American materials scientist (born 1983)

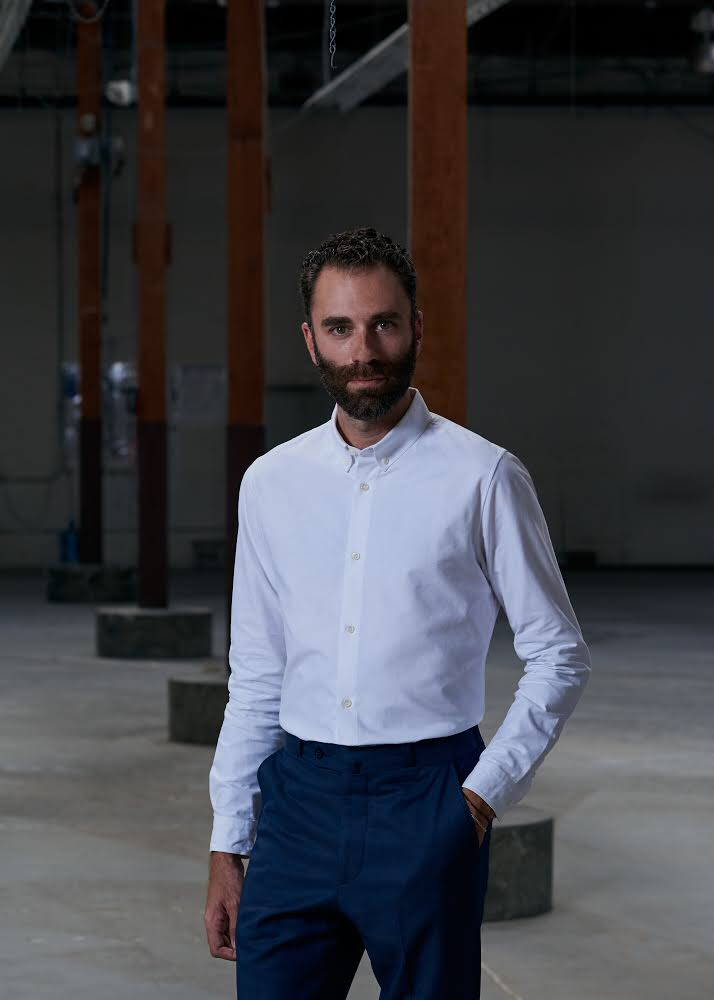
- Born: 1983 (age 42–43); Manhattan, New York City, New York, U.S.
- Education: University of Pennsylvania; University of California, Berkeley (PhD)
- Occupations: Materials scientist, businessman
- Known for: CEO of MycoWorks, Co-founder of Alphabet Energy

Matthew L. Scullin is an American materials scientist and businessman, best known for his work in sustainability related to methane emissions reduction from the oil & gas and agriculture industries. He was named Forbes 30 Under 30 in 2012 and has published over 50 papers and patents, garnering over 1700 citations and an h-index of 22.

He was formerly the CEO Emeryville, California-based MycoWorks, a biomaterials company making leathers from fungal mycelium. Previously, he was CEO of Alphabet Energy, which he co-founded in 2008 with Peidong Yang. Alphabet Energy was the leader in commercial thermoelectric waste heat recovery systems, having been named a Technology Pioneer by the World Economic Forum in 2013 when Scullin was recognized in Davos.

Scullin was born and raised in the Alphabet City neighborhood of Manhattan, where he attended the United Nations International School. He graduated from the University of Pennsylvania magna cum laude, where he won the R.M. Brick Award in Materials Science, and then went on to complete his Ph.D. in Materials Science at the University of California, Berkeley with advisers Ramamoorthy Ramesh and Arun Majumdar. He has lectured about cleantech and entrepreneurship at the Kellogg School of Management, Haas School of Business, HEC Paris, University of Pennsylvania, Stanford, and the Lawrence Berkeley National Laboratory.

Most of Scullin's work relates to ideas in microstructures of materials, crystallography, and symmetry, and how engineering these allows for novel properties in materials. In 2007 Scullin collaborated with architects Aranda\Lasch on a commissioned piece entitled "Rules of Six" for the exhibit Design and the Elastic Mind at the MoMA in New York.

He is also a DJ and musician, and has performed with and DJed for M.I.A. and BC Kingdom.
