= Xiaojing Yan =

- Born: 1978 (age 47–48); Jiangsu, China
- Education: Indiana University of Pennsylvania

Xiaojing Yan (simplified Chinese 闫晓静, last name is Yan) is a contemporary Chinese Canadian artist known for her work in sculpture, installation and public art.
