= Vera Meyer =

German biotechnologist

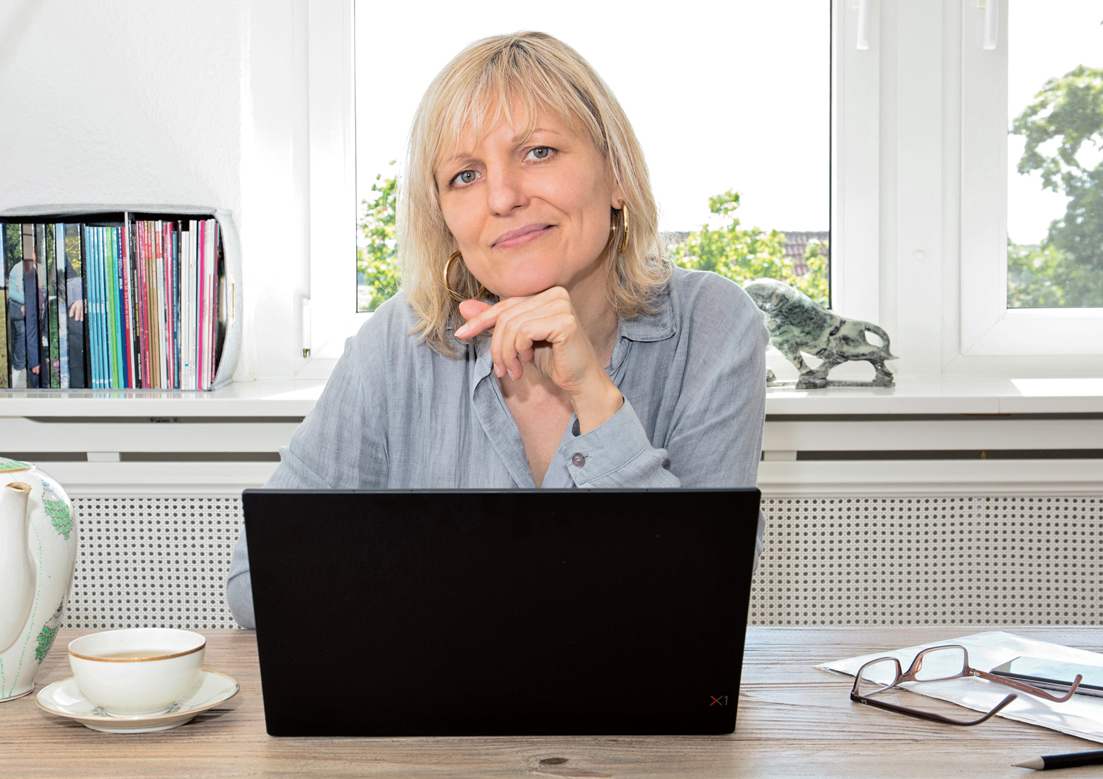
- Vera Meyer in 2020
- Born: 1970 (age 55–56); Hoyerswerda
- Education: Technische Universität Berlin
- Scientific career
- Fields: Biotechnology
- Workplaces: Technische Universität Berlin; Leiden University

Vera Meyer (born c. 1970 in Hoyerswerda) is a German biotechnologist and professor at Technische Universität Berlin. She is head of the department for Applied and Molecular Microbiology. Her main scientific field is the research of fungi and their potential use for a sustainable circular economy. Meyer also works as a visual artist, combining her scientific knowledge in microbiology with artistic creation.

== Life ==
Vera Meyer studied biotechnology at the Sofia University (Bulgaria) and at Technische Universität Berlin, where she graduated in 1996. In 2001 she earned a doctoral degree at the Institute of Biotechnology of the TU Berlin, followed 2008 by the habilitation in Microbiology and Genetics.

As a visiting scientist, her studies brought Meyer to the Imperial College of Science, Technology and Medicine in London (2003) and to the department of Fungal Genetics and Metabolomics at Leiden University in the Netherlands (2005 - 2006). In 2008, Meyer was appointed assistant professor for Molecular Microbiology and Biotechnology at Leiden University, a position she held for three years. Since 2011 she is professor at the Institute of Biotechnology and head of its department for Applied and Molecular Microbiology at TU Berlin. Her scientific work in the field of fungal biotechnology has been published in more than 120 publications (as of December 2022). In 2021 Vera Meyer was awarded a prize for excellence in teaching for her digital lectures during the COVID-19 pandemic.

Since 2008 Vera Meyer is creating works of art using the pseudonym V. meer. The emphasis was first on painting and graphics, from 2013 on the focus shifted toward sculptures. She invents objects from chance finds like forest mushrooms, decaying wood and scrap metal. Inspired by her scientific work with fungi in microbiology, she merges these materials in the sense of a found object. Through her art work she wants to enhance awareness for fungi and their potential in biotechnology and for a sustainable bioeconomy in general. Together with the architect Sven Pfeiffer she is the founder of the Berlin SciArt collective MY-CO-X, which was established in 2020 and took part in the TinyBe 2021 exhibition with the house sculpture MY-CO SPACE. In 2024 the sculpture is part of the show "Closer to Nature" at Berlinische Galerie, Germany. The show's focus is a change of paradigm in modern architecture for more sustainability.

== Research and science ==
Meyer's scientific focus is particularly on the research and optimization of fungal cell factories. The goal is a more effective use of the metabolic processes of fungi. Their potential can be utilised for producing pharmaceuticals, platform chemicals or proteins, as well as for the production of biomaterials needed for a sustainable bioeconomy. Meyer's team of researchers at Technische Universität Berlin pursues a holistic approach, combining procedures out of synthetic biology and systems biology. Gene technology methods, such as CRISPR-Cas9 and the generation of huge omics data, are being used for predicting gene functions and gene regulatory networks. This way, Meyer's group succeeded in optimizing Aspergillus niger as a cell factory for proteins and, for the first time, also for pharmaceuticals (European Patent EP 3 119 900 B1). The combination of synthetic biology and systems biology is uncharted territory for scientists. Bringing these two scientific approaches together shall enable the transition from a descriptive to a predictive biology in the long run.

== Interdisciplinary activities ==
Vera Meyer supports the idea of citizen science. Through inter- and transdisciplinary projects she gathers scientists, citizens, artists and designer to involve them in scientific research works of her university department. The outcomes of the most recent projects Mind the Fungi! and Engage with Fungi were both published as a book. Meyer regards these collaborations as incubators to envision future ideas for bio-based living environments. In 2019 she launched an Artist in Residence program at her department to maintain a continuous collaboration with people in the arts.

Meyer favours a change in paradigm with regard to scientific publications and demands a culture of Open Access. In 2014 she founded the first open access journal for the field of fungal biology (Fungal Biology and Biotechnology) and acts as a co-publisher there since.

Vera Meyer is spokeswoman of the European think tank EUROFUNG and member of the German National Academy of Engineering (Acatech).

=== Further activities and memberships ===
- Founding member and scientific advisor of the Dutch biotechnology company HiTeXacoat
- Board member of Dechema
- Scientific advisory board member of the US-American biotech company MycoWorks
- From 2014 to 2020 she was spokeswoman of the expert group Fungal Biology and Biotechnology of the Association for General and Applied Microbiology (VAAM)

== Selected publications ==
- with Franziska Wanka, Janneke van Gent, Mark Arentshorst, Cees A. M. J. J. van den Hondel, Arthur F. J. Ram: Fungal Gene Expression on Demand: an Inducible, Tunable, and Metabolism-Independent Expression System for Aspergillus niger (American Society for Microbiology, 2011)
- with Corrado Nai: The beauty and the morbid: fungi as source of inspiration in contemporary art (2016)
- with Franziska Wanka, Timothy Cairns, Simon Boecker, Christian Berens, Anna Happel, Xiaomei Zheng, Jibin Sund, Sven Krappmann: Tet-on, or Tet-off, that is the question: Advanced conditional gene expression in Aspergillus (ScienceDirect / Fungal Genetics and Biology, 2016)
- with Mikael R. Andersen, Axel A. Brakhage, Gerhard H. Braus, Mark X. Caddick, Timothy C. Cairns, Ronald P. de Vries, Thomas Haarmann, Kim Hansen, Christiane Hertz-Fowler, Sven Krappmann, Uffe H. Mortensen, Miguel A. Peñalva, Arthur F. J. Ram, Ritchie M. Head: Current challenges of research on filamentous fungi in relation to human welfare and a sustainable bio-economy: a white paper, Fungal Biol Biotechnol 3, 6 (2016)
- with Corrado Nai and Alexander Idnurm: Openness and visibility of fungal bio(techno)logy (2017)
- with Edeltraud Mast-Gerlach and Martin Weinhold: Vita activa in biotechnology: what we do with fungi and what fungi do with us (2017)
- with Timothy C. Cairns and Corrado Nai: How a fungus shapes biotechnology: 100 years of Aspergillus niger research (2018)
- with P. Schäpe, M.J. Kwon, B. Baumann, B. Gutschmann, S. Jung, S. Lenz, B. Nitsche, N. Paege, T. Schütze, T.C. Cairns: Updating genome annotation for the microbial cell factory Aspergillus niger using gene co-expression network (Oxford Academic, Nucleic Acids Research, 2018)
- Merging science and art through fungi (2019)
- with Evelina Y. Basenko, J. Philipp Benz, Gerhard H. Braus, Mark X. Caddick, Michael Csukai, Ronald P. de Vries, Drew Endy, Jens C. Frisvad, Nina Gunde-Cimerman, Thomas Haarmann, Yitzhak Hadar, Kim Hansen, Robert I. Johnson, Nancy P. Keller, Nada Kraševec, Uffe H. Mortensen, Rolando Perez, Arthur F. J. Ram, Eric Record, Phil Ross, Volha Shapaval, Charlotte Steiniger, Hans van den Brink, Jolanda van Munster, Oded Yarden, Han A. B. Wösten: Growing a circular economy with fungal biotechnology: a white paper., Meyer, V., Basenko, E.Y., Benz, J.P. et al., Fungal Biol Biotechnol 7, 5 (2020)
- V. meer, ARTOMICS, art catalogue publication on occasion of solo exhibition, Berlin (2020)
- as publisher with Regine Rapp: MInd the Fungi, Berlin (2020)
- with Matthias C. Rillig, Karine Bonneval, Christian de Lutz, Johannes Lehmann, India Mansour: Ten simple rules for hosting artists in a scientific lab, TU Berlin (2021)
- as publisher with Sven Pfeiffer: Engage with Fungi, Berlin Universities Publishing (2022)
