= Ecovative Design =

American construction materials manufacturer

Ecovative
- Type: Private
- Industry: Biomaterials
- Founded: 2007; 19 years ago
- Headquarters: Green Island, New York 42.752685°N 73.694229°W
- Key people: Eben Bayer, Gavin McIntyre
- Products: MycoComposite, MycoFlex, Forager, MyForest Foods, MyBacon, Airloom, Grow.Bio, Mycelium Bricks, Mycelium SIPS, AirMycelium, Solid State Fermentation, Mushroom Farming, Mushroom Spawn, AirMycelium
- Number of employees: 120
- Website: ecovative.com; mushroompackaging.com; grow.bio; myforestfoods.com; forager.bio

Ecovative LLC is a materials company headquartered in Green Island, New York, that provides sustainable alternatives to plastics and polystyrene foams for packaging, building materials as well as farm harvested high performance mycelium materials and proteins to reduce animal agriculture.

== History ==
Ecovative was developed from a university project of founders Eben Bayer and Gavin McIntyre. In their Inventor's Studio course at Rensselaer Polytechnic Institute taught by Burt Swersey, Eben and Gavin developed and then patented a method of growing a mushroom-based insulation, initially called Greensulate before founding Ecovative Design in 2007. In 2007 they were awarded $16,000 from the National Collegiate Inventors and Innovators Alliance.

Since 2008, when they were awarded $700,000 first place in the Picnic Green Challenge the company has developed and commercialized production of a protective packaging called EcoCradle that is now used by Dell, Puma SE, and Steelcase. In 2010 they were awarded $180,000 from the National Science Foundation and in 2011 the company received investment from 3M New Ventures, The DOEN Foundation, and Rensselaer Polytechnic Institute allowing them to double their current staff of 25.

In spring 2012, Ecovative Design opened a new production facility and announced a partnership with Sealed Air to expand production of the packaging materials. In 2014 their material was used in a brick form in 'Hy-Fi', a 40-foot (12 m) tower displayed in New York by the Museum of Modern Art and they started selling "grow-it-yourself" kits.

In November 2019, the company announced a $10M investment to support their new Mycelium Foundry.

In February 2020, IKEA committed to using Ecovative technology for packaging, replacing polystyrene.

In April 2021, Ecovative Design received a $60M investment to develop new applications for their technology and scale up manufacturing.

== Mushroom materials ==
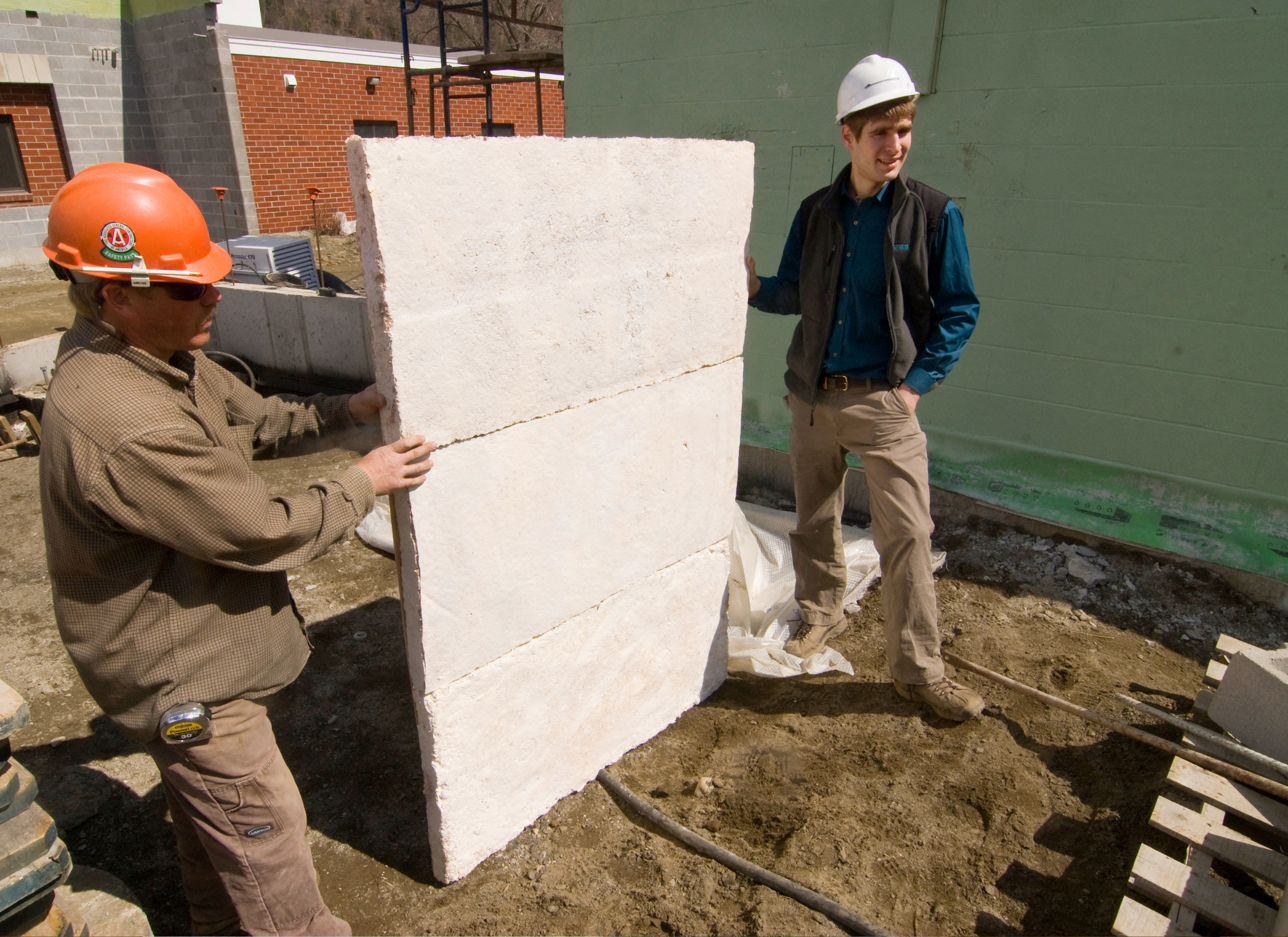
A thermal insulation panel, made of bio-material extracted from mushroom mycelium, ready for installation

Mushroom composite materials are a novel class of renewable bio-material grown from fungal mycelium and low-value non-food agricultural materials, like shredded hemp stalks, corn husks, soybean hulls and more, using a patented process developed by Ecovative in 2007. Ecovative's legacy technology, MycoComposite, is the basis for sustainable protective packaging, building and construction insulation, automotive and aerospace components and even surfboards.

The entire process to grow MyComposite takes 7 days. Once the mycelium has been mixed with the chosen substrate it is left to grow in a form in a dark room at ambient room temperature for about five days, during which time the fungal mycelial network binds the agricultural substrate together resulting in light, robust and organic home compostable material that can be used within many products, including building materials, thermal insulation panels and protective packaging. The product is rendered inert through a baking process in a kiln that stops the mycelium from growing further once the desired outcome is achieved.

The environmental footprint of the products is minimized through the use of agricultural waste, reliance on natural and non-controlled growth environments, and home compostable final products. The founders' intention is that this technology should replace polystyrene and other petroleum-based products that take many years to decompose, or release toxic forever chemicals.

=== Compostable Protective Packaging ===
A renewable and compostable replacement for polystyrene packaging, that was originally called 'EcoCradle. The name was changed to Mushroom Packaging in 2012 and it is now grown by licensees of the technology globally. Ecovative still makes this product available under license in the United States and it is available to order through their mycelium materials website www.grow.bio.

=== Mycelium Construction Materials ===
A natural and renewable replacement for engineered wood, formed from compressed mushroom material and requiring no numerical control. Architect David Benjamin of The Living, working with Ecovative and Arup, built 'Hy-Fi', a temporary 40 feet (12 m) external exhibit at the Museum of Modern Art in New York City in 2014. David Benjamin and Ecovative then collaborated again on an Autodesk project in 2024 for the City of Oakland to construct a 130+ unit affordable housing building in the heart of the city. Through environmental testing it was found that the mycelium composite Ecovative grew for the exterior panels made the project Carbon Negative thanks to the substrate that was chosen making the building a large carbon sink. MycoComposite panels also benefit construction projects as they are sound deadening as well.

=== AirMycelium Platform - Solid State Fermentation ===
In 2012, scientists and engineers at Ecovative partnered with the EPA to grow a pure mycelium foam with the intention of using it for a shoe sole alternative to plastic. The experimentation in the lab for this project led to the discovery of Ecovative's latest technology platform, AirMycelium.

Ecovative's AirMycelium Platform utilizes existing mushroom farming infrastructure, specifically Dutch Style Mushroom Grow Chambers, utilizing over 3 billion lbs of existing global mushroom farming infrastructure. This platform enables the production of organic oyster mushroom mycelium proteins for meatless meats, elastomeric foams and high performance textiles often referred to globally as Mushroom Leather.

MyBacon

Ecovative's flagship breakfast protein is MyBacon currently in distribution in the United States from Ecovative's spinout company MyForest Foods - established in 2020. MyBacon is available in Whole Foods, Fairway Markets, Earth Fare, Hungry Root, Fresh Direct, Good Eggs, celebrity favorite grocer Erewon and independent grocers.

Forager Foams and Hides

In 2021, Ecovative launched Forager to bring high performance mycelium textiles and mycelium foams to the fashion, automotive and aerospace industries. Working with brands like PVH Corp (the parent company of Tommy Hilfiger and Calvin Klein), Reformation, Wolverine World Wide and ECCO Leather.

=== Other uses ===
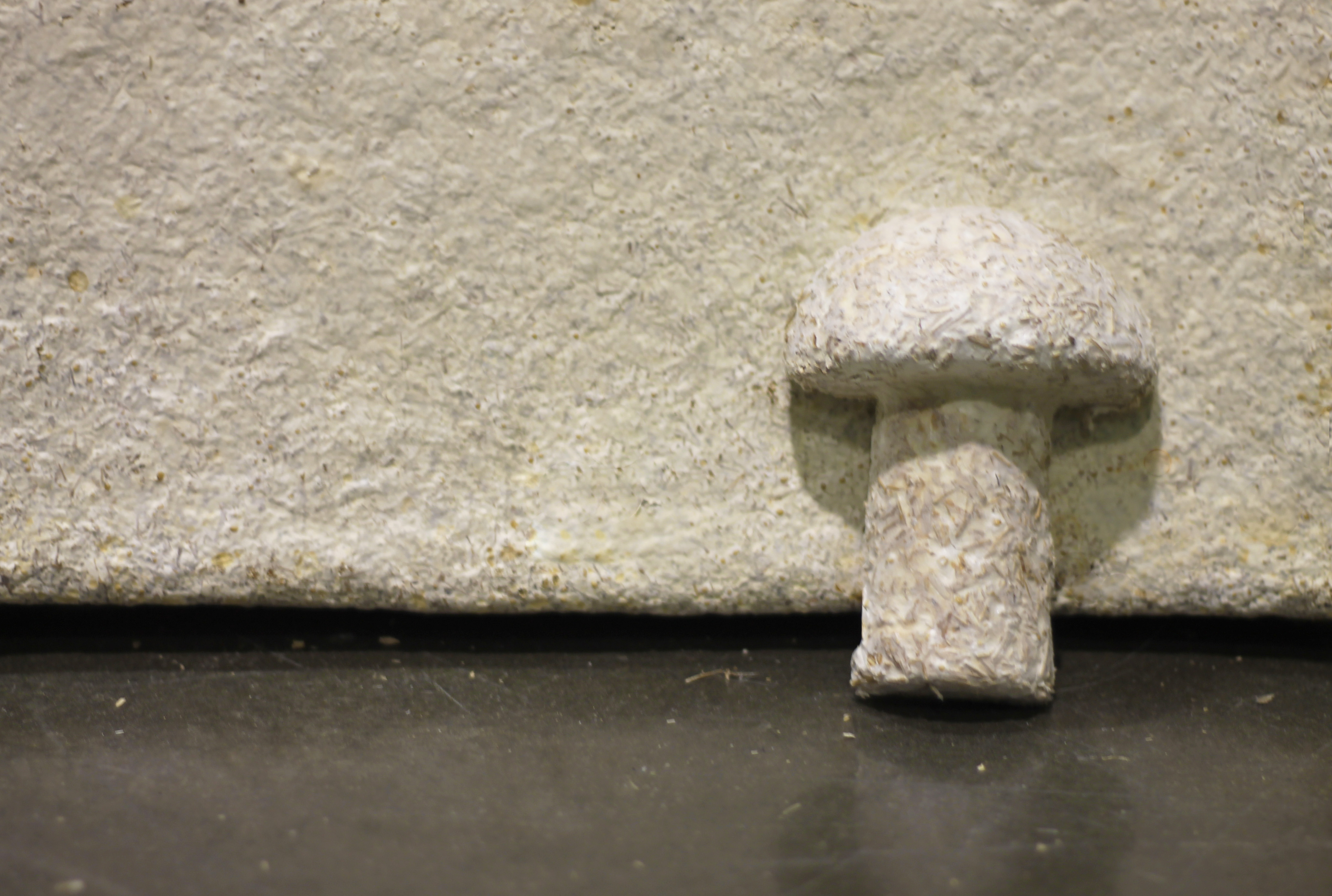
A mushroom figurine grown by Ecovative stands against a material panel.

Ecovative offer a 'Grow-it-yourself' kit allowing people to create mushroom materials themselves, used to create products including lamp shades. These can be ordered through their mycelium supply website www.grow.bio.

Working with the University of Aachen, Dutch designer Eric Klarenbeek used 3D printing technology to gown a chair without using plastic, metal or wood.

== Media ==
Popular Science featured the composite insulation in its 2009 Invention Awards. A season six episode of CSI: New York, also featured the insulation as lab technicians tested the materials' flame resistant properties after finding particles on a victim's clothing. Packaging World magazine featured Ecovative on its July 2011 cover, suggesting that the company is poised to "be a game changer in various industries." The World Economic Forum also recognized Ecovative as a Technology Pioneer in 2011. Additionally, the founders were featured on the PBS show, Biz Kid$, in episode 209, "The Green Economy & You."

Since 2019 Ecovative has been feature in the History of the Future on PBS - Season 1 Episode 2, Merlin Sheldrakes book Entangled Life, as well as the documentary Web of Life.

== Support ==
The development of the material and processes has been supported by the Picnic Green Challenge, the Environmental Protection Agency, National Collegiate Inventors and Innovators Alliance (NCIIA), ASME, the National Science Foundation, NYSERDA, 3M New Ventures, The DOEN Foundation, Rensselaer Polytechnic Institute and a license agreement with Sealed Air. In addition to an array of awards, Ecovative's materials have been extensively highlighted in Material ConneXion libraries around the world.
