= Fungiculture =

Commercial cultivation of fungi

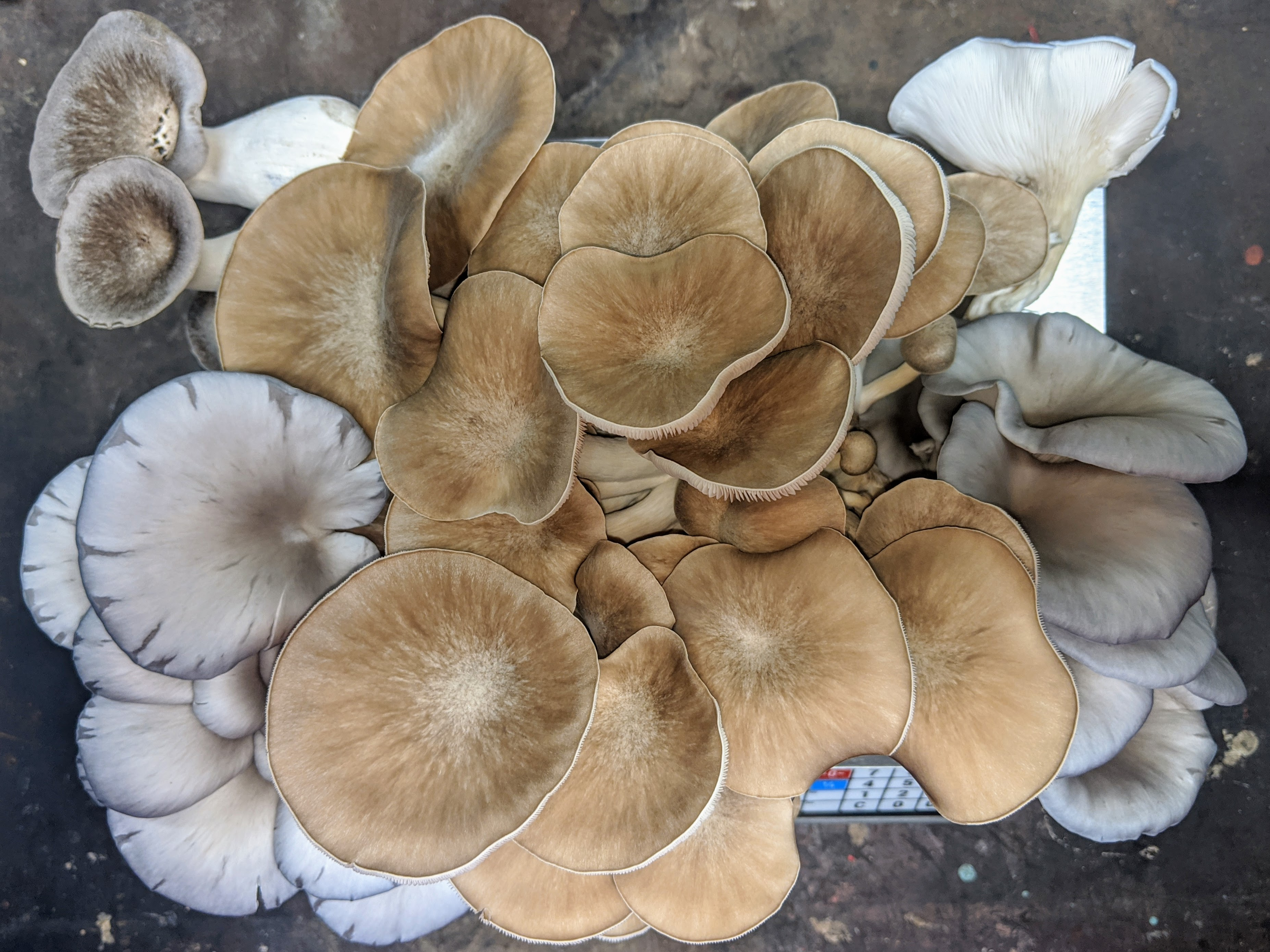
Variety of mushrooms cultivated for culinary use

Fungiculture is the cultivation of fungi such as mushrooms. Cultivating fungi can yield foods (primarily mushrooms), medicine, construction materials and other products. A mushroom farm is involved in the business of growing fungi.

The word is also commonly used to refer to the cultivation of fungi by animals such as leafcutter ants, termites, ambrosia beetles, and marsh periwinkles.

== Overview ==
As fungi, mushrooms require different conditions than plants for optimal growth. Plants develop through photosynthesis, a process that converts atmospheric carbon dioxide into carbohydrates, especially cellulose. While sunlight provides an energy source for plants, mushrooms derive all of their energy and growth materials from their growth medium, through biochemical decomposition processes. This does not mean that light is an irrelevant requirement, since some fungi use light as a signal for fruiting. However, all the materials for growth must already be present in the growth medium. Mushrooms grow well at relative humidity levels of around 95–100%, and substrate moisture levels of 50 to 75%.

Instead of seeds, mushrooms reproduce through spores. Spores can be contaminated with airborne microorganisms, which will interfere with mushroom growth and prevent a healthy crop.

Mycelium, or actively growing mushroom culture, is placed on a substrate—usually sterilized grains such as rye or millet—and induced to grow into those grains. This is called inoculation. Inoculated grains (or plugs) are referred to as spawn. Spores are another inoculation option, but are less developed than established mycelium. Since they are also contaminated easily, they are only manipulated in laboratory conditions with a laminar flow cabinet.

== Techniques ==
All mushroom growing techniques require the correct combination of humidity, temperature, substrate (growth medium) and inoculum (spawn or starter culture). Wild harvests, outdoor log inoculation and indoor trays all provide these elements.

=== Outdoor logs ===
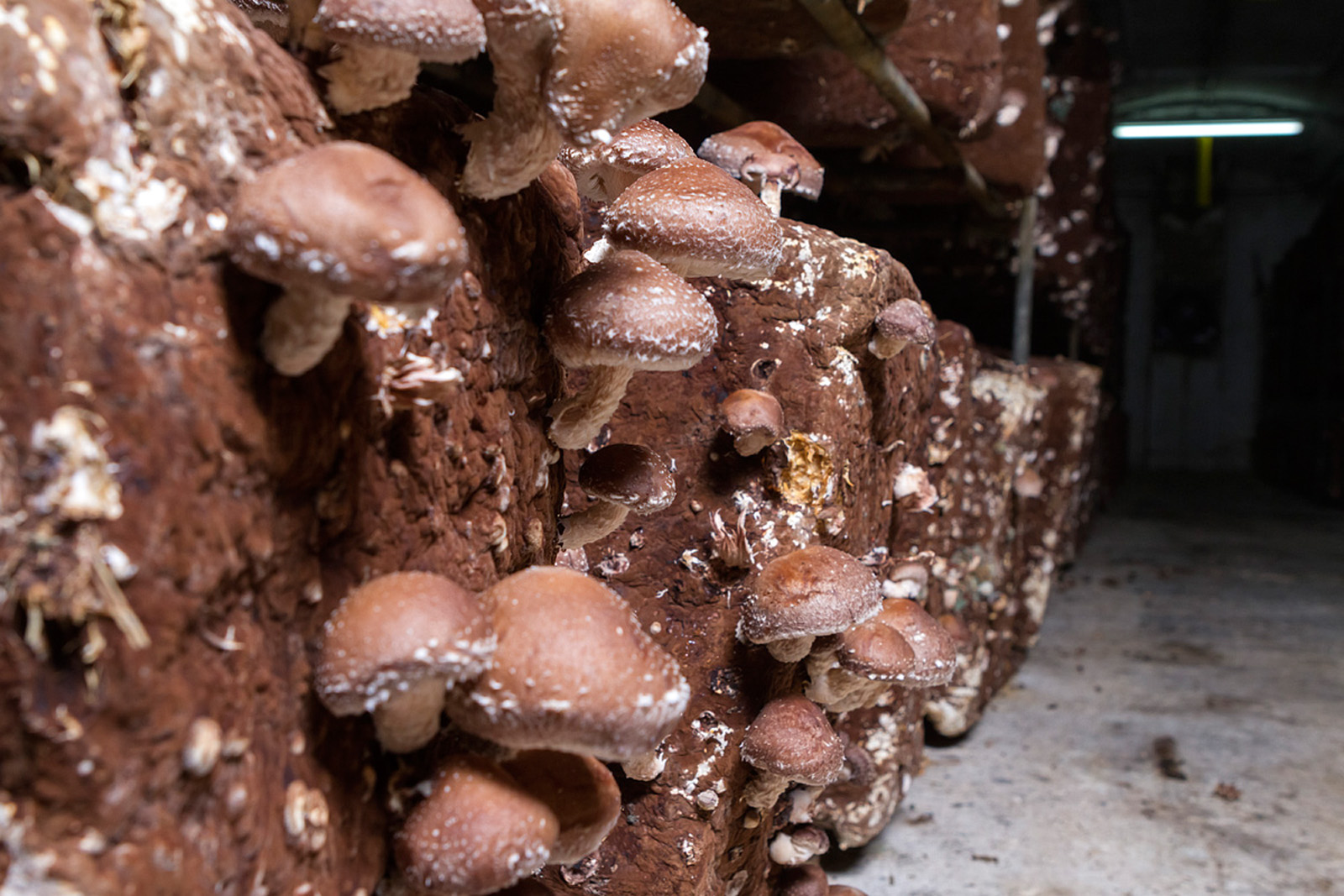
Cultivated shiitake mushrooms

Mushrooms can be grown on logs placed outdoors in stacks or piles, as has been done for hundreds of years. Sterilization is not performed as part of this method. Since production may be unpredictable and seasonal, less than 5% of commercially sold mushrooms are produced this way. Here, tree logs are inoculated with spawn, then allowed to grow as they would in wild conditions. Fruiting, or pinning, is triggered by seasonal changes, or by briefly soaking the logs in cool water. Shiitake and oyster mushrooms have traditionally been produced using the outdoor log technique, although controlled techniques such as indoor tray growing or artificial logs made of compressed substrate have been substituted.

Shiitake mushrooms that are grown under a forested canopy are considered non-timber forest products. In the Northeastern United States, shiitake mushrooms can be cultivated on a variety of hardwood logs including oak, American beech, sugar maple and hophornbeam. Softwood should not be used to cultivate shiitake mushrooms because the resin of softwoods will oftentimes inhibit the growth of the shiitake mushroom making it impractical as a growing substrate.

To produce shiitake mushrooms, 1 metre (3 ft) hardwood logs with a diameter ranging between 10–15 cm (4–6 in) are inoculated with the mycelium of the shiitake fungus. Inoculation is completed by drilling holes in hardwood logs, filling the holes with cultured shiitake mycelium or inoculum, and then sealing the filled holes with hot wax. After inoculation, the logs are placed under the closed canopy of a coniferous stand and are left to incubate for 12 to 15 months. Once incubation is complete, the logs are soaked in water for 24 hours. Seven to ten days after soaking, shiitake mushrooms will begin to fruit and can be harvested once fully ripe.

=== Indoor trays ===
Indoor mushroom cultivation for the purpose of producing a commercial crop was first developed in caves in France. The caves provided a stable environment (temperature, humidity) all year round. The technology for a controlled growth medium and fungal spawn was brought to the UK in the late 1800s in caves created by quarrying near areas such as Bath, Somerset. Growing indoors allows the ability to control light, temperature and humidity while excluding contaminants and pests. This enables consistent production, regulated by spawning cycles. By the mid-twentieth century this was typically accomplished in windowless, purpose-built buildings, for large-scale commercial production.

Indoor tray growing is the most common commercial technique, followed by containerized growing. The tray technique provides the advantages of scalability and easier harvesting.

The labour-intensive nature of harvesting and labour shortages in the industry have driven research interest in automation since the early 1990s; however, active commercial deployments only began in the 2020s, as advances in robotics and machine vision made such systems viable.

Several robotic harvesting approaches have been developed for use with Dutch shelf systems:

- On-shelf Cartesian robotic systems in which manipulators move along linear axes integrated into the shelf structure, providing full planar coverage of the growing bed.
- Mobile SCARA and other articulated robotic arms that travel along shelf infrastructure, using computer vision and suction-based or finger grippers to identify and pick mushrooms; such systems have been developed by commercial and research organisations, including 4AG Robotics, University of Warwick, and Nanjing Agricultural University.
- Conveyor-based systems in which growing trays are transported to a stationary manipulator, designed in Vineland Research and Innovation Centre and implemented commercially by Mycionics.
- Multi-arm systems in which multiple manipulators operate simultaneously on the same shelf to increase harvesting speed.

There are a series of stages in the farming of the most widely used commercial mushroom species Agaricus bisporus. These are composting, fertilizing, spawning, casing, pinning, and cropping.

=== Six phases of mushroom cultivation ===
Phase	Time span	Temperature	Process(procedure)
1. Phase I composting	6–14 days		Regulate water and NH_{3} content through microbial action. Add fertilizer / additives
2. Phase II composting or pasteurization	7–18 days via composting method, ~2 hours for pasteurization (heat sterilization)		Reduce number of potentially harmful microbes through further composting, or apply heat sterilization. Remove unwanted NH_{3}.
3. Spawning and growth	14–21 days	24 to 27 °C (75 to 80 °F); must be above 23 °C (74 °F); for rapid growth. Must be below 27 to 29 °C (80 to 85 °F) to avoid damaging mycelia	Add starter culture. Allow mycelium to grow through substrate and form a colony. Depends on substrate dimensions and composition. Finished when mycelium has propagated through entire substrate layer
4. Casing	13–20 days		Promote the formation of primordia, or mushroom pins. Add a top covering or dressing to the colonized substrate. Fertilizing with nitrogen increases yields. Induces pinning
5. Pinning	18–21 days		Earliest formation of recognizable mushrooms from mycelium. Adjusting temperature, humidity and CO_{2} will also affect the number of pins, and mushroom size
6. Cropping	Repeated over 7- to 10-day cycles		Harvest

Complete sterilization is not required or performed during composting. In most cases, a pasteurization step is included to allow some beneficial microorganisms to remain in the growth substrate.

Specific time spans and temperatures required during stages 3–6 will vary respective to species and variety. Substrate composition and the geometry of growth substrate will also affect the ideal times and temperatures.

Pinning is the trickiest part for a mushroom grower, since a combination of carbon dioxide (CO_{2}) concentration, temperature, light, and humidity triggers mushrooms towards fruiting. Up until the point when rhizomorphs or mushroom "pins" appear, the mycelium is an amorphous mass spread throughout the growth substrate, unrecognizable as a mushroom.

Carbon dioxide concentration becomes elevated during the vegetative growth phase, when mycelium is sealed in a gas-resistant plastic barrier or bag which traps gases produced by the growing mycelium. To induce pinning, this barrier is opened or ruptured. CO_{2} concentration then decreases from about 0.08% to 0.04%, the ambient atmospheric level.

=== Indoor oyster mushroom farming ===
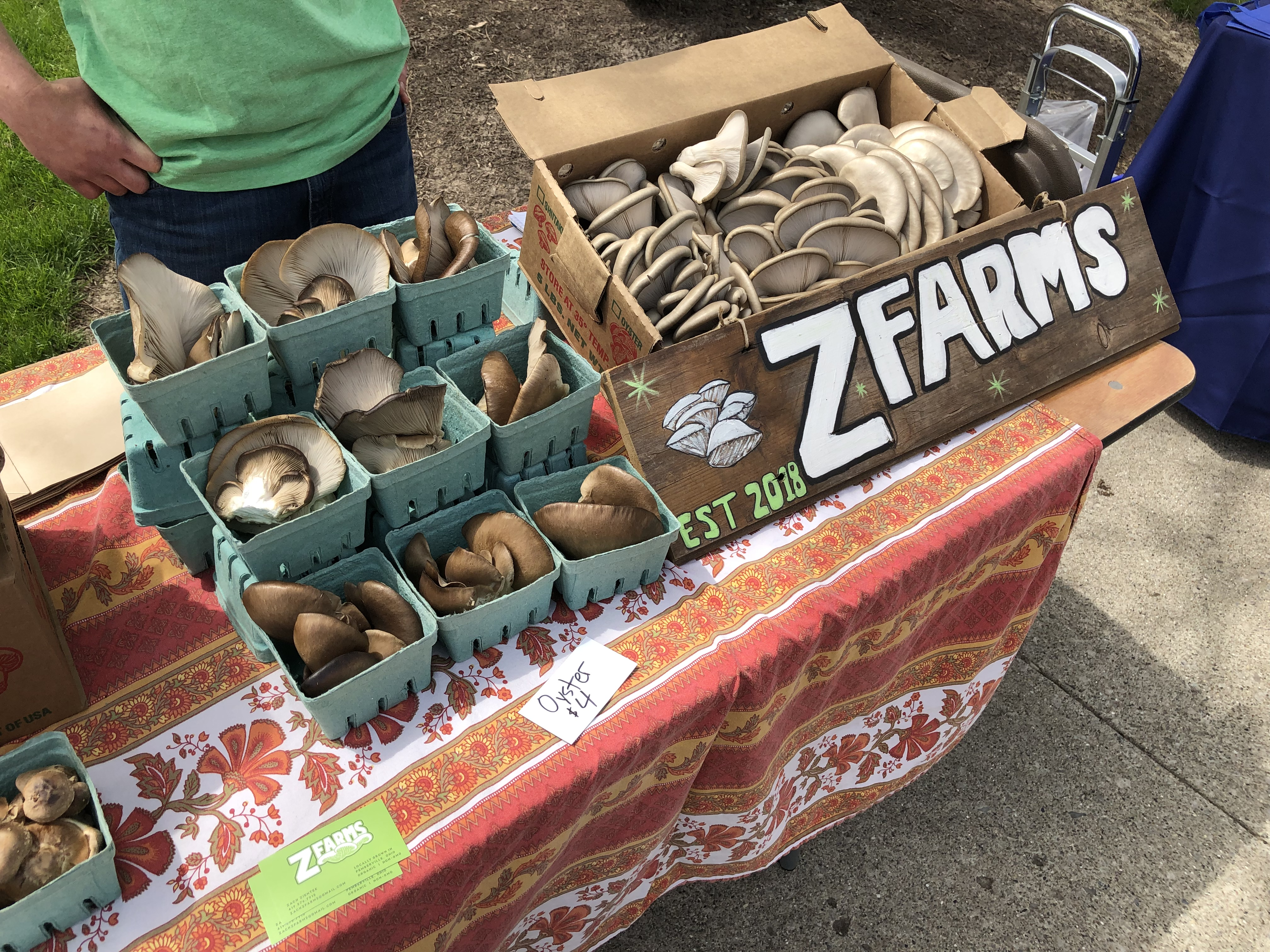
A merchant selling oyster mushrooms that have been grown indoors

Oyster mushroom farming is rapidly expanding around many parts of the world. Oyster mushrooms are grown in substrate that comprises sterilized wheat, paddy straw and even used coffee grounds, and they do not require much space compared to other crops. The per unit production and profit extracted is comparatively higher than other crops. Oyster mushrooms can also be grown indoors from kits, most commonly in the form of a box containing growing medium with spores.

== Substrates ==
Mushroom production converts the raw natural ingredients into mushroom tissue, most notably the carbohydrate chitin.

An ideal substrate will contain enough nitrogen and carbohydrate for rapid mushroom growth. Common bulk substrates include several of the following ingredients:

- Wood chips or sawdust
- Mulched straw (usually wheat, but also rice and other straws)
- Strawbedded horse or poultry manure
- Corncobs
- Waste or recycled paper
- Coffee pulp or grounds
- Nut and seed hulls
- Cottonseed hulls
- Cocoa bean hulls
- Cottonseed meal
- Soybean meal or hulls
- Brewer's grain
- Ammonium nitrate
- Urea

Mushrooms metabolize complex carbohydrates in their substrate into glucose, which is then transported through the mycelium as needed for growth and energy. While it is used as a main energy source, its concentration in the growth medium should not exceed 2%. For ideal fruiting, closer to 1% is ideal.

== Pests and diseases ==
Parasitic insects, bacteria and other fungi all pose risks to indoor production. Sciarid or phorid flies may lay eggs in the growth medium, which hatch into maggots and damage developing mushrooms during all growth stages. Bacterial blotch caused by Pseudomonas bacteria or patches of Trichoderma green mold also pose a risk during the fruiting stage. Pesticides and sanitizing agents are available to use against these infestations. Biological controls for sciarid and phorid flies have also been proposed.

Trichoderma green mold can affect mushroom production, for example in the mid-1990s in Pennsylvania leading to significant crop losses. The contaminating fungus originated from poor hygiene by workers and poorly prepared growth substrates.

Mites in the genus Histiostoma have been found in mushroom farms. Histiostoma gracilipes feeds on mushrooms directly, while H. heinemanni is suspected to spread diseases.

== Commercially cultivated fungi ==
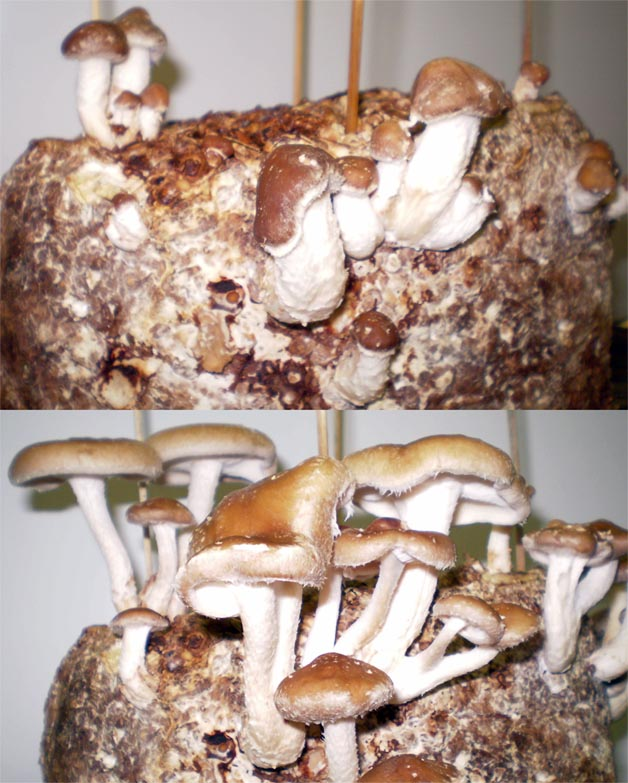
Home-cultivated shiitake developing over approximately 24 hours

- Agaricus bisporus, also known as champignon and the button mushroom. This species also includes the portobello and crimini mushrooms.
- Auricularia cornea and Auricularia heimuer (Wood ear fungus), two closely related species of jelly fungi that are commonly used in Chinese cuisine.
- Clitocybe nuda, or blewit, is cultivated in Europe.
- Flammulina velutipes, the "winter mushroom", also known as enokitake in Japan
- Fusarium venenatum – the source for mycoprotein which is used in Quorn, a meat analogue.
- Hypsizygus tessulatus (also Hypsizygus marmoreus), called shimeji in Japanese, it is a common variety of mushroom available in most markets in Japan. Known as "Beech mushroom" in Europe.
- Lentinus edodes, also known as shiitake, oak mushroom. Lentinus edodes is largely produced in Japan, China and South Korea. Lentinus edodes accounts for 10% of world production of cultivated mushrooms. Common in Japan, China, Australia and North America.
- Phallus indusiatus – (bamboo mushroom), traditionally collected from the wild, it has been cultivated in China since the late 1970s.
- Pleurotus species are the second most important mushrooms in production in the world, accounting for 25% of total world production. Pleurotus mushrooms are cultivated worldwide; China is the major producer. Several species can be grown on carbonaceous matter such as straw or newspaper. In the wild they are usually found growing on wood.
  - Pleurotus citrinopileatus (golden oyster mushroom)
  - Pleurotus cornucopiae (branched oyster mushroom)
  - Pleurotus eryngii (king trumpet mushroom)
  - Pleurotus ostreatus (oyster mushroom)

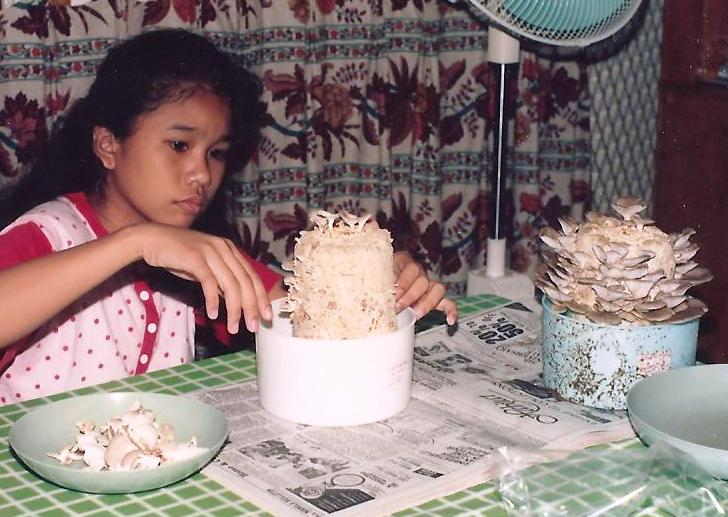
Harvesting Pleurotus ostreatus, cultivated using spawns embedded in sawdust mixture placed in plastic containers

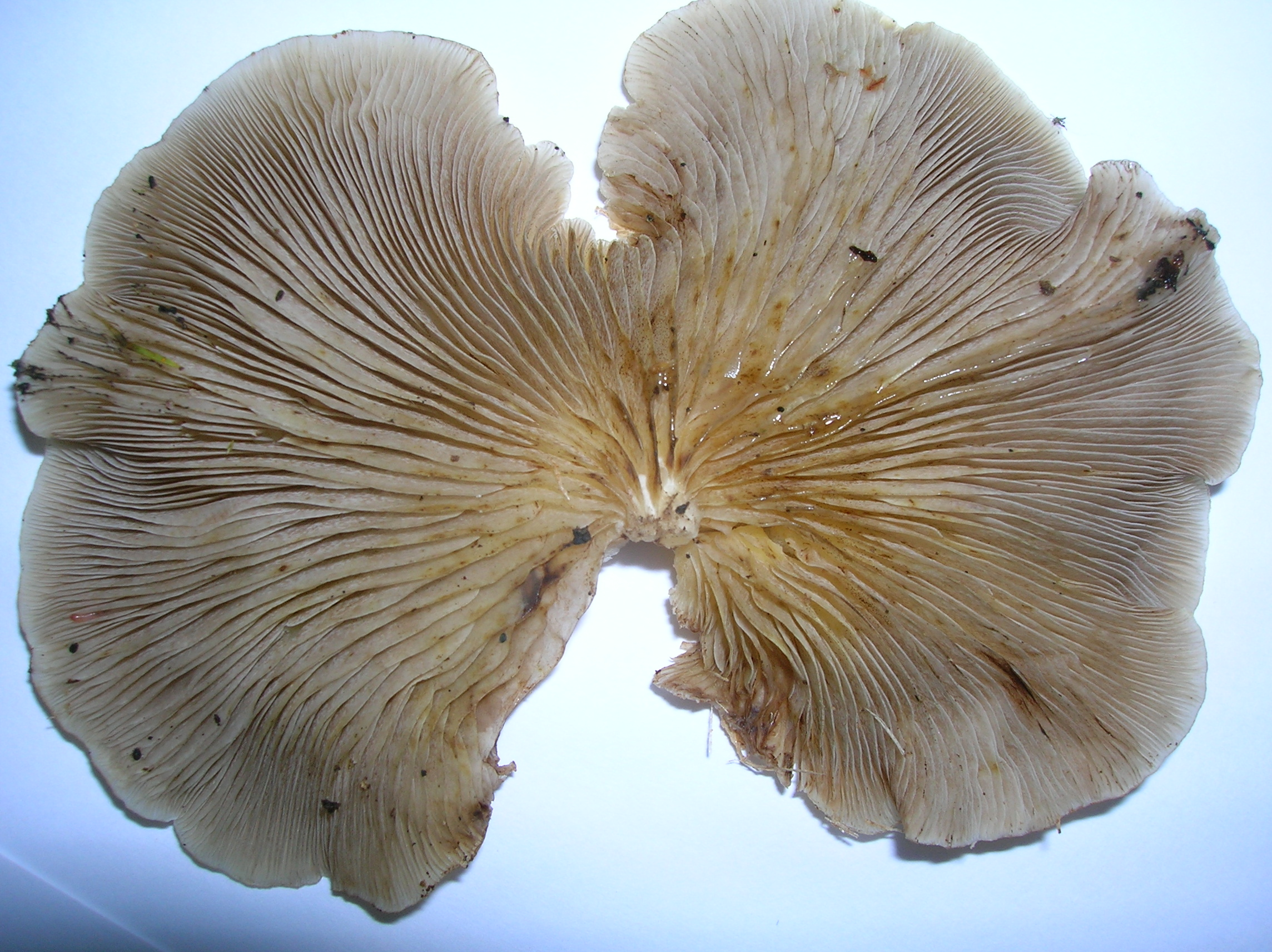
Details of the gill structure of the edible oyster mushroom Pleurotus ostreatus

- Rhizopus oligosporus – the fungal starter culture used in the production of tempeh. In tempeh the mycelia of R. oligosporus are consumed.
- Sparassis crispa – recent developments have led to this being cultivated in California. It is cultivated on large scale in Korea and Japan.
- Tremella fuciformis (Snow fungus), another type of jelly fungus that is commonly used in Chinese cuisine.
- Tuber spp., (the truffle), Truffles belong to the ascomycete grouping of fungi. The truffle fruitbodies develop underground in mycorrhizal association with certain trees e.g. oak, poplar, beech, and hazel. Being difficult to find, trained pigs or dogs are often used to sniff them out for easy harvesting.
  - Tuber aestivum (Summer or St. Jean truffle)
  - Tuber magnatum (Piemont white truffle)
  - Tuber melanosporum (Périgord truffle)
  - T. melanosporum × T. magnatum (Khanaqa truffle)
  - Terfezia spp. (desert truffle)
- Ustilago maydis (corn smut), a fungal pathogen of the maize plant. Also called the Mexican truffle, although not a true truffle.
- Volvariella volvacea (the "paddy straw mushroom") Volvariella mushrooms account for 16% of total production of cultivated mushrooms in the world.

== Production regions in North America ==
Pennsylvania is the top-producing mushroom state in the United States, and celebrates September as "Mushroom Month".

The borough of Kennett Square is a historical and present leader in mushroom production. It currently leads production of Agaricus-type mushrooms, followed by California, Florida and Michigan.

Other mushroom-producing states:

- East: Connecticut, Delaware, Florida, Maryland, New York, Pennsylvania, Tennessee, Maine, and Vermont
- Central: Illinois, Oklahoma, Texas, and Wisconsin
- West: California, Colorado, Montana, Oregon, Utah and Washington

The lower Fraser Valley of British Columbia, which includes Vancouver, has a significant number of producers – about 60 as of 1998.

== Production in Europe ==
Oyster mushroom cultivation has taken off in Europe as of late. Many entrepreneurs nowadays find it as a quite profitable business, a start-up with a small investment and good profit. Italy and the Netherlands Italy are between the top ten mushroom producing countries in the world, producing 785,000 tonnes and 307,000 tonnes a year, respectively. The world's biggest producer of mushroom spawn is also situated in France.

According to research conducted on the production and marketing of mushrooms in Europe, mushrooms are exported from countries such as Poland, the Netherlands, Belgium, and Lithuania, and are imported by countries such as the UK, Germany, France, and Russia.

== Education and training ==
Oyster mushroom cultivation is a sustainable business where different natural resources can be used as a substrate. The number of people becoming interested in this field is rapidly increasing. The possibility of creating a viable business in urban environments by using coffee grounds is appealing for many entrepreneurs.

Since mushroom cultivation is not a subject available at school, most urban farmers learned it by doing. The time to master mushroom cultivation is time consuming and costly in missed revenue. For this reason there are numerous companies in Europe specialized in mushroom cultivation that are offering training for entrepreneurs and organizing events to build community and share knowledge. They also show the potential positive impact of this business on the environment.

Courses about mushroom cultivation can be attended in many countries around Europe. There is education available for growing mushrooms on coffee grounds, more advanced training for larger scale farming, spawn production and lab work and growing facilities.

Events are organised with different intervals. The Mushroom Learning Network gathers once a year in Europe. The International Society for Mushroom Science gathers once every five-years somewhere in the world.

== See also ==
- Agriculture
- Horticulture
- Underground farming
