= Selenoneine =

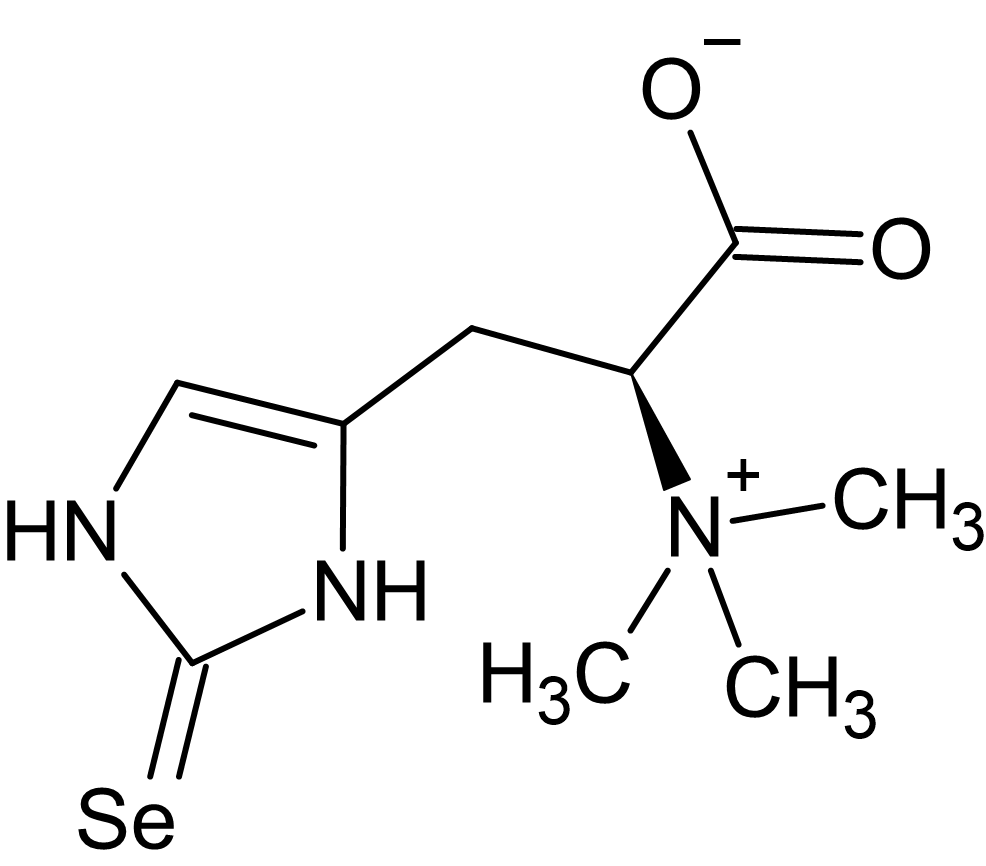

Names
- IUPAC name (2-selenyl-N^{α},N^{α},N^{α}-trimethyl-L-histidine or 3-(2-hydroseleno-1H-imidazol-5-yl)-2-(trimethylammonio)propanoate)

Identifiers
3D model (JSmol)	Interactive image; selenol tautomer: Interactive image
ChEBI	CHEBI:79071
ChemSpider	34449139
PubChem CID	selenol tautomer: 86289064
- InChI: InChI=1S/C9H15N3O2Se/c1-12(2,3)7(8(13)14)4-6-5-10-9(15)11-6/h5,7H,4H2,1-3H3,(H2-,10,11,13,14,15)/t7-/m0/s1 Key: MTIQLELFQVCRSW-ZETCQYMHSA-N; selenol tautomer: InChI=1S/C9H14N3O2Se/c1-12(2,3)7(8(13)14)4-6-5-10-9(15)11-6/h5,7H,4H2,1-3H3,(H-,10,11,13,14)/t7-/m0/s1 Key: FONQTPPQNMLDTP-ZETCQYMHSA-N
- SMILES: C[N+](C)(C)[C@@H](Cc1c[nH][c](=[Se])[nH]1)C([O-])=O; selenol tautomer: C[N+](C)(C)[C@@H](CC1=CN=C(N1)[Se])C(=O)[O-]

Properties
Chemical formula	C_{9}H_{14}N_{3}O_{2}Se
Molar mass	275.201 g·mol^{−1}

Related compounds
Related compounds	Selenocysteine; Ergothioneine; Histidine
- Except where otherwise noted, data are given for materials in their standard state (at 25 °C [77 °F], 100 kPa). Infobox references

Selenoneine (SEN) is a selenium-containing ergothioneine derivative where the selenium (Se) atom replaces a sulfur atom. It is made by microorganisms and is concentrated by vertebrates higher up in the food chain. It is mainly found in marine environments.

== Occurrence ==
Selenoneine is made by microorganisms and concentrated by vertebrates, mainly marine vertebrates, into their bodies. In vertebrates, selenoneine is transported into cells using OCTN1.

It is found in the blood of bluefin tuna, and other sea-dwelling animals like turtles, mackerel, beluga, and giant petrels.

Humans that eat fish have selenoneine in their blood. In populations that eat a lot of fish (Japanese remote islanders and Inuit), about half of the selenium found in their blood is in the form of selenoneine.

== Function ==
It is an antioxidant with the ability to react with reactive oxygen species. It also boosts the action of GPx1.

Selenoneine inhibits angiotensin-converting enzyme.

Selenoneine has been reported in the context of methyl mercury detoxification in fish and seabirds. It may transform the methylmercury-L-cysteine complex into a mercury tetraselenolate complex.

== Biosynthesis ==
Selenoneine is produced by microorganisms using enzymes that form a selenium-carbon bond. Specifically it can be made when the biosynthetic machinery for ergothioneine uses selenocysteine instead of cysteine.

It can also be made using a specialized biosynthetic cluster senABC in bacteria, where senA is homologous to the hercynine oxygenase egtB in ergothioneine biosynthesis and senC is homologous to the selenophosphate synthetase selD. senA combines hercynine and a selenosugar together. The hercynine is made by egtD, a gene from the ergothioneine pathway. The selenosugar is made by senB using a UDP-sugar and a selenophosphate ion made by senC. The crystal structures of selA and senB were solved in 2024.

== Derivatives ==
A related derivative, Se-methylselenoneine (MeSEN) is found in lesser quantities in mackerel, sardine and tuna. MeSEN is the major metabolized form of SEN in mammals, being mainly excreted in urine. SEN's metabolism stands in contrast with other dietary sources of selenium such as selenite, SeMet, and SeCys, which are instead metabolized to selenide and then excreted as a selenosugar or as trimethylselenonium.

In air selenoneine is easily oxidised to a dimer containing a diselenide bond (Se–Se).

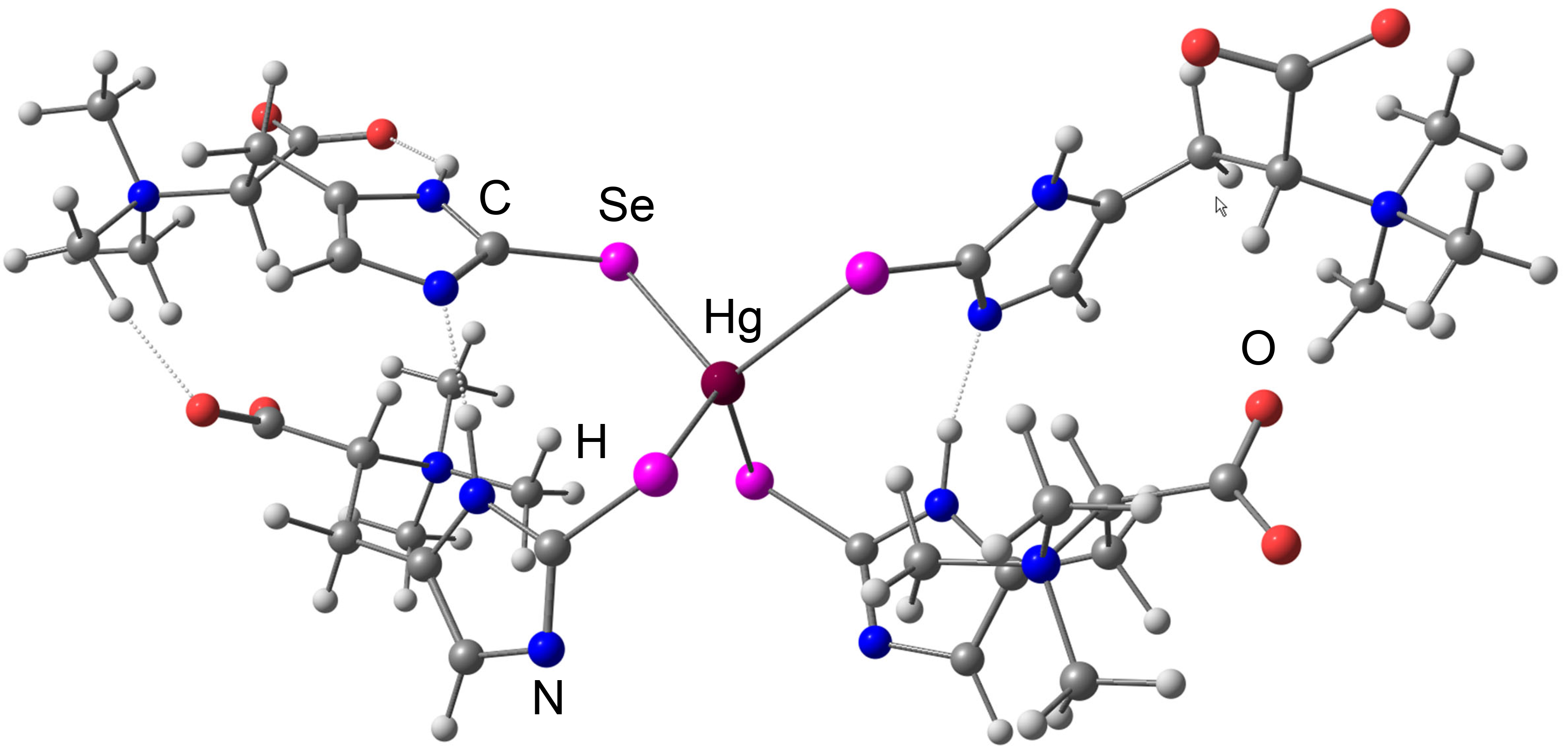
Mercury tetraselenolate complex formed with selenoneine.
