= Tamogitake =

Tamogitake may refer to:

- Pleurotus ostreatus, also known as the "Oyster Mushroom"
- Pleurotus citrinopileatus, also known as the "Golden Oyster Mushroom"
