= Ovothiol A =

Names
- Systematic IUPAC name (2S)-2-Amino-3-(1-methyl-4-sulfanyl-1H-imidazol-5-yl)propanoic acid
- Other names 1-N-Methyl-4-mercaptohistidine

Identifiers
CAS Number	108418-13-9
3D model (JSmol)	Interactive image
ChEBI	CHEBI:83318
ChemSpider	115159
MeSH	C061475
PubChem CID	130131
UNII	BJK39KC2PD
CompTox Dashboard (EPA)	DTXSID90910720
- InChI: InChI=1S/C7H11N3O2S/c1-10-3-9-6(13)5(10)2-4(8)7(11)12/h3-4,13H,2,8H2,1H3,(H,11,12)/t4-/m0/s1 Key: XWKKYVJREGXHFO-BYPYZUCNSA-N; InChI=1/C7H11N3O2S/c1-10-3-9-6(13)5(10)2-4(8)7(11)12/h3-4,13H,2,8H2,1H3,(H,11,12)/t4-/m0/s1 Key: XWKKYVJREGXHFO-BYPYZUCNBB
- SMILES: CN1C=NC(=C1C[C@@H](C(=O)O)N)S

Properties
Chemical formula	C_{7}H_{11}N_{3}O_{2}S
Molar mass	201.24 g·mol^{−1}
- Except where otherwise noted, data are given for materials in their standard state (at 25 °C [77 °F], 100 kPa). Infobox references

Ovothiol A (N1-methyl-4-mercaptohistidine) is a highly reducing antioxidant which accumulates to very high levels in the eggs of certain marine invertebrates, including sea urchins, scallops and starfish, where it acts to quench the hydrogen peroxide released during fertilization.

This thiol-type antioxidant is also found in some human pathogens such as Trypanosoma cruzi and Leishmania donovani.

It is synthesized by the addition and oxidation of cysteine to histidine by 5-histidylcysteine sulfoxide synthase, followed by methylation and further reduction.

== See also ==
- Ergothioneine
