= 5-Histidylcysteine sulfoxide synthase =

Class of enzymes

5-Histidylcysteine sulfoxide synthase is the initial enzyme in the ovothiol biosynthetic pathway. It facilitates the oxidative addition of cysteine to histidine, resulting in the formation of 5-histidylcysteine sulfoxide. This enzyme is present in trypanosomes, where it also exhibits S-Adenosyl methionine (SAM)-dependent methyltransferase activity, catalyzing the methylation of the N1 position.
