= Ergothioneine =

Naturally occurring amino acid

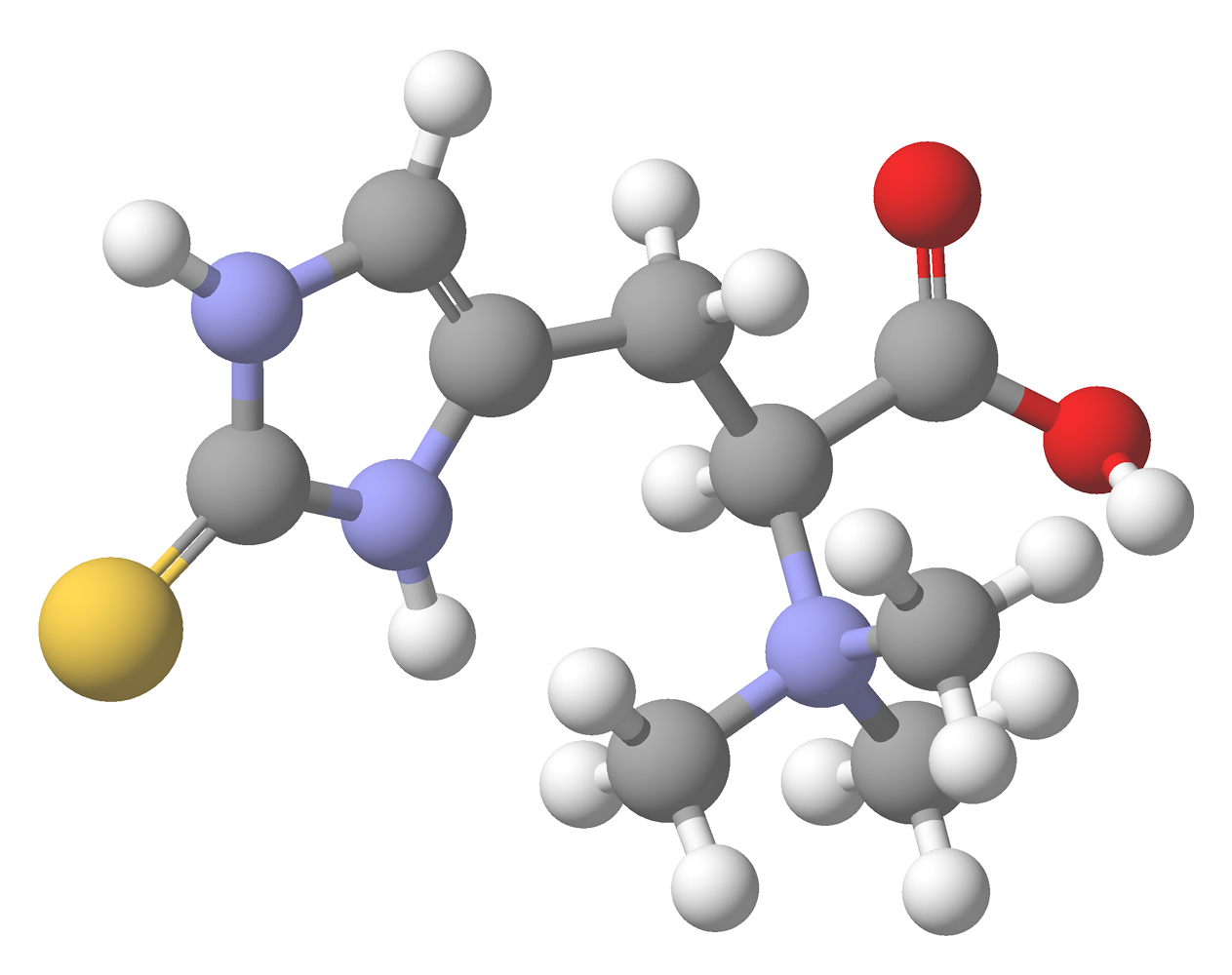

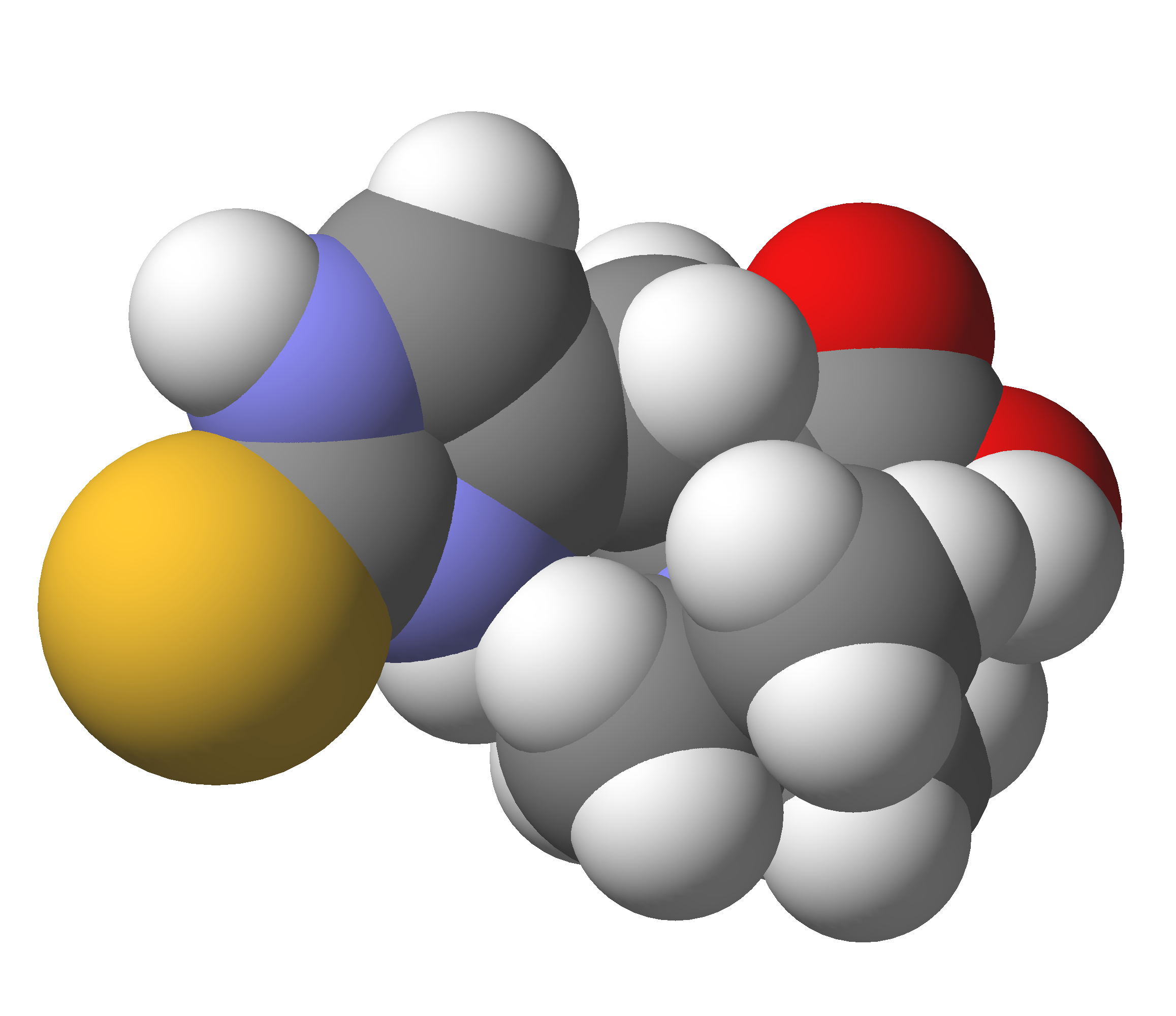

Names
- Preferred IUPAC name (2S)-3-(2-Sulfanylidene-2,3-dihydro-1H-imidazol-4-yl)-2-(trimethylazaniumyl)propanoate
- Other names L-Ergothioneine; (+)-Ergothioneine; Thiasine; Sympectothion; Ergothionine; Erythrothioneine; Thiolhistidinebetaine

Identifiers
CAS Number	497-30-3
3D model (JSmol)	Interactive image; Interactive image
ChEBI	CHEBI:4828
ChemSpider	4508619
ECHA InfoCard	100.007.131
KEGG	C05570
PubChem CID	5351619
UNII	BDZ3DQM98W
CompTox Dashboard (EPA)	DTXSID901020082
- InChI: InChI=1S/C9H15N3O2S/c1-12(2,3)7(8(13)14)4-6-5-10-9(15)11-6/h5,7H,4H2,1-3H3,(H2-,10,11,13,14,15)/t7-/m0/s1 Key: SSISHJJTAXXQAX-ZETCQYMHSA-N; InChI=1/C9H15N3O2S/c1-12(2,3)7(8(13)14)4-6-5-10-9(15)11-6/h5,7H,4H2,1-3H3,(H2-,10,11,13,14,15)/t7-/m0/s1 Key: SSISHJJTAXXQAX-ZETCQYMHBA
- SMILES: C[N+](C)(C)C(CC1=CNC(=S)N1)C(=O)[O-]; S=C1N\C(=C/N1)C[C@@H](C([O-])=O)[N+](C)(C)C

Properties
Chemical formula	C_{9}H_{15}N_{3}O_{2}S
Molar mass	229.30 g/mol
Appearance	white solid
Melting point	275 to 277 °C (527 to 531 °F; 548 to 550 K)
- Except where otherwise noted, data are given for materials in their standard state (at 25 °C [77 °F], 100 kPa). verify (what is ?) Infobox references

Ergothioneine (EGT) is a naturally occurring amino acid and is a thiourea derivative of histidine, containing a sulfur atom on the imidazole ring. This compound occurs in relatively few organisms, notably actinomycetota, cyanobacteria, and certain fungi. Ergothioneine was discovered by Charles Tanret in 1909 and named after the ergot fungus from which it was first purified, with its structure being determined in 1911. Unlike other ergot alkaloids, ergothioneine is not an ergoline derivative.

In humans, ergothioneine is acquired exclusively through the diet and accumulates in erythrocytes, bone marrow, liver, kidney, seminal fluid, and eyes. Although the effect of ergothioneine in vivo is under preliminary research, its physiological role in humans is unknown. Ergothioneine is sold as a dietary supplement.

== Metabolism and sources ==
Ergothioneine has been found in bacteria, plants, and animals, sometimes at high (millimolar) levels relative to the environment. Foods found to contain ergothioneine include liver, kidney, black beans, kidney bean, and oat bran, with the highest levels in bolete and oyster mushrooms, especially in Pleurotus citrinopileatus. Levels can be variable, even within species and some tissues can contain much more than others. In the human body, the largest amounts of ergothioneine are found in erythrocytes, eye lens, semen, and skin.

Although many species contain ergothioneine, only a few make it; the others absorb it from their diet or, in the case of plants, from their environment. Biosynthesis has been detected in Actinomycetota, such as Mycobacterium smegmatis and certain fungi, such as Neurospora crassa (red bread mold) and Schizosaccharomyces pombe (fission yeast). Lactobacillus reuteri was reported to produce ergothioneine but later was clarified to merely accumulate rather than produce it.

Other species of bacteria, such as Bacillus subtilis, Escherichia coli, Proteus vulgaris, and Streptococcus, as well as fungi in the Saccharomycotina cannot make ergothioneine.

=== Biosynthetic pathway ===
The metabolic pathway to produce ergothioneine starts with the methylation of histidine to produce histidine betaine (hercynine). The sulfur atom is then incorporated from cysteine. The biosynthetic genes of ergothioneine have been described in detail for Mycobacterium smegmatis, Neurospora crassa, Schizosaccharomyces pombe (with homologues in Aspergillus, a genus important in food fermentation), and Caldithrix abyssi. This pathway has recently also been discovered in plants.

Different groups of organisms use different approaches to sulfur-addition. Aerobic bacteria and fungi use an O_{2}-dependent reaction that is catalyzed by a mononuclear non-heme iron enzyme, with cysteine or γ-glutamylcysteine as the sulfur source. Green sulfur bacteria and some archaea use a rhodanese-like sulfur transferase to perform oxidative polar substitution. Caldithrix uses a metallopterin-dependent bifunctional enzyme that combines an N-terminal domain similar to a tungsten-dependent acetylene hydratase and a C-terminal cysteine desulfurase domain. Homologs of the Caldithrix system are found in anaerobic bacteria and some archaea.

=== Industrial sources ===
Mass production of EGT can be achieved by microbial fermentation, i.e. culturing of microbes. The highest productivities are derived from microbes that have undergone genetically engineering to overexpress the biosynthetic pathway, either a native version (if the microbe natively makes ergothioneine) or foreign (transgenic) version. Escherichia coli and Saccharomyces cerevisiae (baker's yeast), two species commonly used in bio-engineering but unable to natively produce EGT, can reach EGT concentrations of 5400 mg/L and 2390 mg/L respectively for their culture media: around a hundred times of what non-modified microbes can achieve. In 2025, an even higher concentration of 7200 mg/L was achieved with E. coli without requiring the feeding of expensive methionine (methyl source) or cysteine by adding genes to have the bacteria make its own.

== Structure ==
Ergothioneine is a thiourea derivative of the betaine of histidine and contains a sulfur atom bonded to the 2-position of the imidazole ring. Typical of thioureas, ergothioneine is less reactive than typical thiols such as glutathione towards alkylating agents like maleimides. It also resists oxidation by air. However, ergothioneine can be slowly oxidized over several days to the disulfide form in acidic solutions.

== Ergothioneine derivatives ==
Various derivatives of ergothioneine have been reported in the literature, such as S-methyl-ergothioneine or selenium-containing selenoneine. The latter is made using the same biosynthetic pathway as ergothioneine when selenocysteine is present.

== Preliminary research ==
Although ergothioneine is under preliminary research, its physiological role in vivo has not been determined.

Mammals use the OCTN1 transporter to move ergothioneine into cells. Knockout of this gene in mouse and zebrafish models produces no substantial overt defect, though stress does amplify the differences.

== Safe intake levels ==
The Panel on Dietetic Products for the European Food Safety Authority reported safe daily limits of 2.82 mg/kg of body weight for infants, 3.39 mg/kg for small children, and 1.31 mg/kg for adults, including pregnant and breastfeeding women.

== See also ==
- Ovothiol
- Oxidative stress
- Reactive oxygen species
