= SLC22A4 =

Protein-coding gene in humans

Identifiers
- Aliases: SLC22A4, OCTN1, solute carrier family 22 member 4, DFNB60
- External IDs: OMIM: 604190; MGI: 1353479; GeneCards: SLC22A4

Gene location (Human)
| Chr. | Chromosome 5 (human) |
| Band | 5q31.1 | Start | 132,294,394 bp |
| Band | 5q31.1 | End | 132,344,190 bp |

Gene location (Mouse)
| Chr. | Chromosome 11 (mouse) |
| Band | 11 B1.3|11 32.07 cM | Start | 53,873,949 bp |
| Band | 11 B1.3|11 32.07 cM | End | 53,918,916 bp |
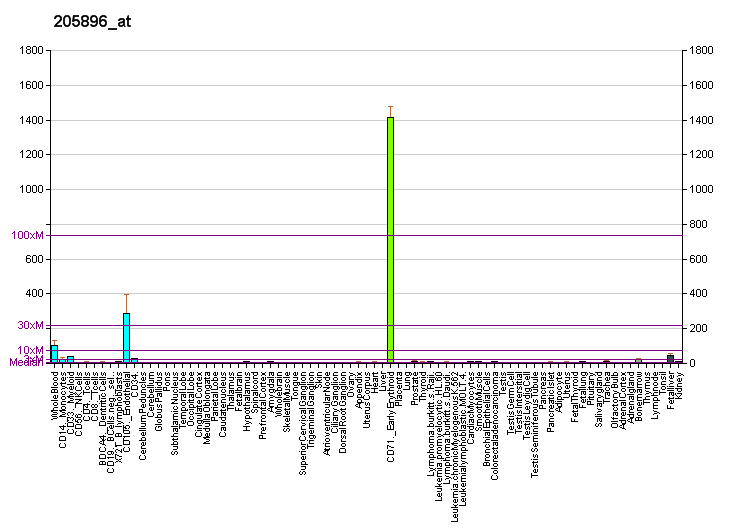
RNA expression pattern
| Bgee | Human / Mouse (ortholog); Top expressed in: bronchial epithelial cell; mucosa of paranasal sinus; right uterine tube; trabecular bone; nasal epithelium; blood; olfactory zone of nasal mucosa; bone marrow; epithelium of nasopharynx; monocyte / Top expressed in: right kidney; lumbar subsegment of spinal cord; proximal tubule; fetal liver hematopoietic progenitor cell; granulocyte; lip; skin of external ear; human kidney; cerebellar cortex; jejunum; More reference expression data |
| BioGPS | More reference expression data |
Gene ontology
| Molecular function | nucleotide binding; PDZ domain binding; transmembrane transporter activity; transporter activity; protein binding; carnitine transmembrane transporter activity; secondary active organic cation transmembrane transporter activity; quaternary ammonium group transmembrane transporter activity; ATP binding; symporter activity; organic anion transmembrane transporter activity |
| Cellular component | integral component of membrane; membrane; plasma membrane; integral component of plasma membrane; apical plasma membrane; mitochondrion |
| Biological process | body fluid secretion; sodium ion transport; quaternary ammonium group transport; ion transport; organic cation transport; carnitine transport; triglyceride metabolic process; carnitine metabolic process; cation transmembrane transport; ion transmembrane transport; carnitine transmembrane transport; transmembrane transport; organic anion transport |
Sources:Amigo / QuickGO
Orthologs
| Databases | NCBI: entry; OMA: entry |
| Species | Human | Mouse |
| Entrez | 6583 | 30805 |
| Ensembl | ENSG00000197208 | ENSMUSG00000020334 |
| UniProt | Q9H015 | Q9Z306 |
| RefSeq (mRNA) | NM_003059 | NM_019687; NM_001330304 |
| RefSeq (protein) | NP_003050 | NP_001317233; NP_062661 |
| Location (UCSC) | Chr 5: 132.29 – 132.34 Mb | Chr 11: 53.87 – 53.92 Mb |
| PubMed search |
- Wikidata
| View/Edit Human | View/Edit Mouse |

Solute carrier family 22, member 4, also known as SLC22A4, is a human gene; the encoded protein is known as the ergothioneine transporter.

== Function ==
The encoded protein is an integral protein of the plasma membrane containing 12 transmembrane segments. The first functional designation of this protein was OCTN1 ("organic cation transporter, novel, type 1"), but efficiency of transport for organic cations (e.g., tetraethylammonium) is very low. The transport efficiency for carnitine is also negligible. Instead, the protein is responsible for the cotransport of sodium ions and ergothioneine, which is an antioxidant, into cells. Thus, a more appropriate functional designation is ETT ("ergothioneine transporter").

== Interactions ==
SLC22A4 has been shown to interact with PDZK1.

== See also ==
- Solute carrier family
