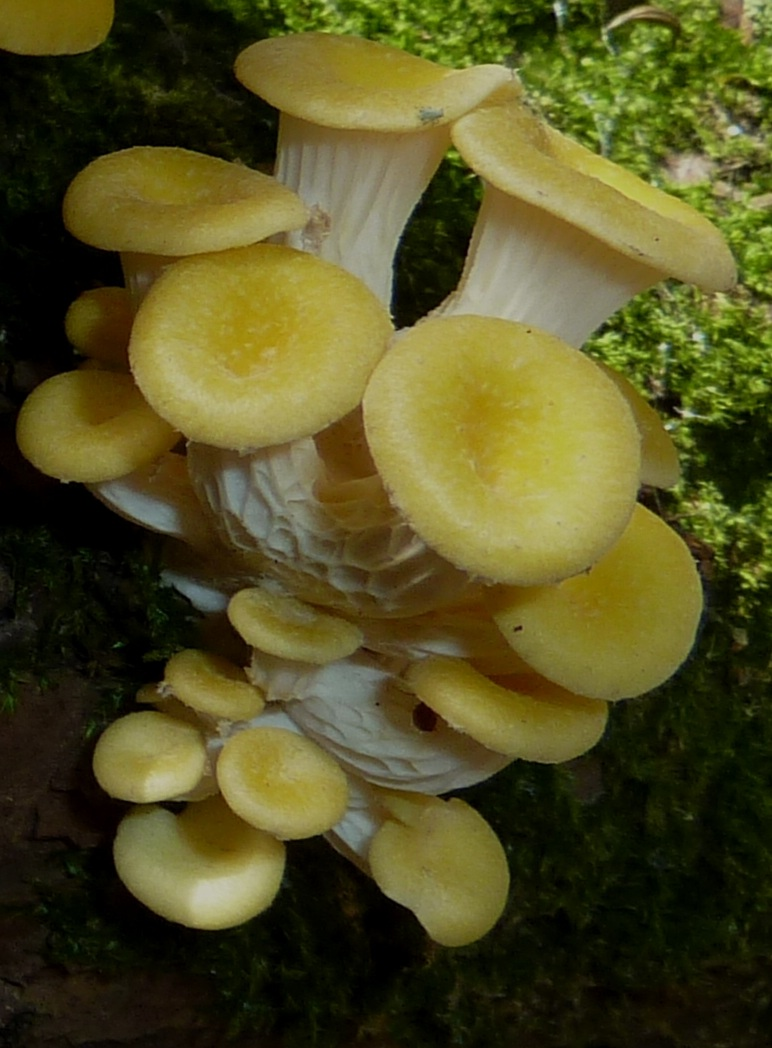

Scientific classification
- Kingdom: Fungi
- Division: Basidiomycota
- Class: Agaricomycetes
- Order: Agaricales
- Family: Pleurotaceae
- Genus: Pleurotus
- Species: P. citrinopileatus

Binomial name
- Pleurotus citrinopileatus Singer (1943)

Synonyms
- Pleurotus cornucopiae subsp. citrinopileatus (Singer) O.Hilber (1993); Pleurotus cornucopiae var. citrinopileatus (Singer) Ohira (1987)

= Pleurotus citrinopileatus =

Species of fungus

Pleurotus citrinopileatus
- Mycological characteristics
- Gills on hymenium
- Cap is flat or depressed
- Hymenium is decurrent
- Stipe is bare
- Spore print is pink
- Ecology is saprotrophic
- Edibility is edible or choice

Pleurotus citrinopileatus, the golden oyster mushroom (tamogitake in Japanese), is a species of gilled fungus. Native to eastern Russia, northern China, and Japan, the species produces an edible mushroom.

== Taxonomy ==
Pleurotus citrinopileatus is very closely related to P. cornucopiae of Europe, with some authors considering them to be at the rank of subspecies.

== Description ==
The fruiting bodies grow in clusters of bright yellow to golden brown caps with a velvety, dry surface texture. The caps are 2–10 centimetres (3/4–4 inches) wide. The flesh is thin and white, with a mild scent and flavour. The stems are cylindrical, white in color, often curved or bent, and about 2–5 cm (3/4–2 in) long and 2–8 mm (1/16–5/16 in) in diameter. The gills are white, closely spaced, and run down the stem. The spores are cylindrical or elliptical in shape, smooth, hyaline, amyloid, and measure 6–9 by 2–3.5 micrometres. The spore print is light pink.

== Ecology ==
Like other oyster mushrooms, the species is a wood-decay fungus. In the wild, it most commonly decays hardwoods such as elm. The first recorded observation of naturalized golden oysters in the United States occurred in 2012 on Mushroom Observer, perhaps a decade after the cultivation of the species began in North America, and they have been found growing on oak, elm, beech, and other hardwoods.

Invasive golden oysters have been found in many states including: Delaware, Illinois, Iowa, Maryland, Massachusetts, Michigan, Minnesota, New York, Ohio, Pennsylvania, and Wisconsin. Their vigorous range expansion is indicative of an invasive species and has sparked widespread public interest. However, until recently they have been considered naturalized. In 2025 a study of golden oysters found that in their introduced range, golden oysters appear to be displacing native fungal communities. In a 2018 population genomics study comparing wild isolates with commercial strains, two of the commercial isolates showed high similarity to all of the wild isolates, representing possible source strains of the wild populations. The study also found highly similar wild isolates collected from geographically distant locations, in some cases over 1,300 kilometres (800 mi) apart. This is strong evidence to suggest that the same cultivated strain has been re-introduced many times over in various parts of the U.S., as opposed to a single introduction event and subsequent spread.

This mushroom is also invasive or naturalized in several African countries: Cameroon, Tanzania, Kenya, Burundi, and Nigeria. It also occurs in the wild in some Asian countries outside its native territory: in Yemen, Korea, and India.

The golden oyster mushroom is eaten by adults (and perhaps larvae) of the pleasing fungus beetle Spondotriplax pallidipes (formerly Tritoma pallidipes), originally described from Southeast Asia. It might even prefer P.citrinopileatus over related species; in warm regions, accidential introductions of this beetle into P.citrinopileatus cultures can grow to reach pest proportions.

== Uses ==
Golden oyster mushrooms are cultivated commercially, usually on a medium of grain, straw, or sawdust. Alternative substrates are pomace from grapes and olives. Pleurotus species are some of the most commonly cultivated mushrooms, particularly in China, due to their ease of cultivation and their ability to convert 100 g of organic refuse into 50-70 g of fresh mushrooms.

In India, different Poaceae species were tried as substrate: cultivated Paddy rice, as well as the wild (and often invasive) species Imperata cylindrica (kunai grass), Neyraudia reynaudiana (Burma reed) and Saccharum spontaneum (wild sugarcane). These were all used as small sun-dried pieces, and sterilized with formalin and carbendazim before inoculating them with mushroom spawn.

In far eastern Russia, it is called il'mak (ильмак), is one of the most popular wild edible mushrooms.

Human cultivation of golden oyster mushrooms outside of its native range continues. However, the practice has been implicated as a major vector for this invasive species. It is recommended that cultivators use local varieties of oyster mushrooms to mitigate ecological damage.

=== Chemistry ===
Pleurotus citrinopileatus mushrooms are a source of antioxidants. Extracts have been studied for their antihyperglycemic properties, decreasing blood sugar levels in diabetic rats. They have also been studied as a source of lipid-lowering drugs.

In one study, among 11 other commonly cultivated or foraged mushroom species, P. citrinopileatus contained the second highest amount of the antioxidant and amino acid ergothioneine at 3.94 mg per gram of dry weight, and fourth highest in glutathione at 1.39 mg per gram of dry weight. Both compounds had their highest concentrations in the pileus tissue. It had the highest amount of ergothioneine among the other saprotrophs within the group.

== See also ==
- List of Pleurotus species
- Ergothioneine
